

459001–459100 

|-bgcolor=#fefefe
| 459001 ||  || — || March 10, 2005 || Mount Lemmon || Mount Lemmon Survey || MAS || align=right data-sort-value="0.59" | 590 m || 
|-id=002 bgcolor=#fefefe
| 459002 ||  || — || January 18, 2009 || Kitt Peak || Spacewatch || — || align=right data-sort-value="0.98" | 980 m || 
|-id=003 bgcolor=#fefefe
| 459003 ||  || — || November 26, 2011 || Kitt Peak || Spacewatch || V || align=right data-sort-value="0.56" | 560 m || 
|-id=004 bgcolor=#fefefe
| 459004 ||  || — || February 22, 1998 || Kitt Peak || Spacewatch || — || align=right data-sort-value="0.96" | 960 m || 
|-id=005 bgcolor=#fefefe
| 459005 ||  || — || December 15, 2004 || Socorro || LINEAR || — || align=right data-sort-value="0.86" | 860 m || 
|-id=006 bgcolor=#fefefe
| 459006 ||  || — || March 2, 2009 || Kitt Peak || Spacewatch || — || align=right data-sort-value="0.60" | 600 m || 
|-id=007 bgcolor=#fefefe
| 459007 ||  || — || November 19, 2000 || Socorro || LINEAR || — || align=right data-sort-value="0.69" | 690 m || 
|-id=008 bgcolor=#E9E9E9
| 459008 ||  || — || May 3, 2009 || Kitt Peak || Spacewatch || — || align=right | 1.5 km || 
|-id=009 bgcolor=#E9E9E9
| 459009 ||  || — || November 14, 2006 || Mount Lemmon || Mount Lemmon Survey || — || align=right | 2.4 km || 
|-id=010 bgcolor=#fefefe
| 459010 ||  || — || November 8, 2007 || Mount Lemmon || Mount Lemmon Survey || — || align=right data-sort-value="0.79" | 790 m || 
|-id=011 bgcolor=#fefefe
| 459011 ||  || — || October 20, 2007 || Mount Lemmon || Mount Lemmon Survey || MAS || align=right data-sort-value="0.69" | 690 m || 
|-id=012 bgcolor=#fefefe
| 459012 ||  || — || November 1, 2011 || Mount Lemmon || Mount Lemmon Survey || — || align=right data-sort-value="0.85" | 850 m || 
|-id=013 bgcolor=#fefefe
| 459013 ||  || — || November 30, 2011 || Mount Lemmon || Mount Lemmon Survey || — || align=right data-sort-value="0.97" | 970 m || 
|-id=014 bgcolor=#fefefe
| 459014 ||  || — || October 20, 2003 || Kitt Peak || Spacewatch || NYS || align=right data-sort-value="0.55" | 550 m || 
|-id=015 bgcolor=#fefefe
| 459015 ||  || — || December 25, 2011 || Kitt Peak || Spacewatch || (5026) || align=right data-sort-value="0.84" | 840 m || 
|-id=016 bgcolor=#fefefe
| 459016 ||  || — || November 20, 2007 || Kitt Peak || Spacewatch || NYS || align=right data-sort-value="0.49" | 490 m || 
|-id=017 bgcolor=#E9E9E9
| 459017 ||  || — || February 3, 2008 || Catalina || CSS || — || align=right | 2.7 km || 
|-id=018 bgcolor=#E9E9E9
| 459018 ||  || — || July 6, 2005 || Kitt Peak || Spacewatch || — || align=right | 1.2 km || 
|-id=019 bgcolor=#E9E9E9
| 459019 ||  || — || September 10, 2010 || Mount Lemmon || Mount Lemmon Survey || — || align=right | 1.2 km || 
|-id=020 bgcolor=#E9E9E9
| 459020 ||  || — || January 16, 2008 || Kitt Peak || Spacewatch || EUN || align=right | 1.3 km || 
|-id=021 bgcolor=#E9E9E9
| 459021 ||  || — || January 13, 2008 || Mount Lemmon || Mount Lemmon Survey || — || align=right | 1.1 km || 
|-id=022 bgcolor=#fefefe
| 459022 ||  || — || March 18, 2009 || Mount Lemmon || Mount Lemmon Survey || — || align=right data-sort-value="0.84" | 840 m || 
|-id=023 bgcolor=#fefefe
| 459023 ||  || — || November 5, 2007 || Kitt Peak || Spacewatch || NYS || align=right data-sort-value="0.54" | 540 m || 
|-id=024 bgcolor=#fefefe
| 459024 ||  || — || December 26, 2011 || Kitt Peak || Spacewatch || — || align=right data-sort-value="0.84" | 840 m || 
|-id=025 bgcolor=#E9E9E9
| 459025 ||  || — || February 11, 2008 || Kitt Peak || Spacewatch || — || align=right | 1.4 km || 
|-id=026 bgcolor=#fefefe
| 459026 ||  || — || January 20, 2009 || Mount Lemmon || Mount Lemmon Survey || — || align=right data-sort-value="0.76" | 760 m || 
|-id=027 bgcolor=#E9E9E9
| 459027 ||  || — || January 11, 2008 || Kitt Peak || Spacewatch || — || align=right data-sort-value="0.94" | 940 m || 
|-id=028 bgcolor=#fefefe
| 459028 ||  || — || November 2, 2007 || Kitt Peak || Spacewatch || — || align=right data-sort-value="0.87" | 870 m || 
|-id=029 bgcolor=#fefefe
| 459029 ||  || — || November 18, 2003 || Kitt Peak || Spacewatch || NYS || align=right data-sort-value="0.63" | 630 m || 
|-id=030 bgcolor=#E9E9E9
| 459030 ||  || — || January 18, 2008 || Mount Lemmon || Mount Lemmon Survey || — || align=right data-sort-value="0.92" | 920 m || 
|-id=031 bgcolor=#fefefe
| 459031 ||  || — || November 14, 1995 || Kitt Peak || Spacewatch || — || align=right data-sort-value="0.87" | 870 m || 
|-id=032 bgcolor=#fefefe
| 459032 ||  || — || September 30, 2011 || Mount Lemmon || Mount Lemmon Survey || — || align=right data-sort-value="0.94" | 940 m || 
|-id=033 bgcolor=#E9E9E9
| 459033 ||  || — || January 28, 2004 || Kitt Peak || Spacewatch || — || align=right data-sort-value="0.75" | 750 m || 
|-id=034 bgcolor=#fefefe
| 459034 ||  || — || May 18, 2009 || Mount Lemmon || Mount Lemmon Survey || NYS || align=right data-sort-value="0.60" | 600 m || 
|-id=035 bgcolor=#E9E9E9
| 459035 ||  || — || April 25, 2010 || WISE || WISE || — || align=right | 1.4 km || 
|-id=036 bgcolor=#E9E9E9
| 459036 ||  || — || April 17, 1996 || Kitt Peak || Spacewatch || — || align=right | 1.3 km || 
|-id=037 bgcolor=#fefefe
| 459037 ||  || — || October 12, 2007 || Mount Lemmon || Mount Lemmon Survey || — || align=right data-sort-value="0.84" | 840 m || 
|-id=038 bgcolor=#fefefe
| 459038 ||  || — || December 31, 2011 || Kitt Peak || Spacewatch || — || align=right data-sort-value="0.80" | 800 m || 
|-id=039 bgcolor=#E9E9E9
| 459039 ||  || — || November 8, 2007 || Mount Lemmon || Mount Lemmon Survey || — || align=right | 1.5 km || 
|-id=040 bgcolor=#E9E9E9
| 459040 ||  || — || November 26, 2011 || Mount Lemmon || Mount Lemmon Survey || — || align=right | 1.5 km || 
|-id=041 bgcolor=#fefefe
| 459041 ||  || — || March 8, 2005 || Anderson Mesa || LONEOS || — || align=right data-sort-value="0.94" | 940 m || 
|-id=042 bgcolor=#fefefe
| 459042 ||  || — || August 19, 2006 || Anderson Mesa || LONEOS || — || align=right | 1.2 km || 
|-id=043 bgcolor=#fefefe
| 459043 ||  || — || November 20, 2007 || Kitt Peak || Spacewatch || — || align=right data-sort-value="0.77" | 770 m || 
|-id=044 bgcolor=#E9E9E9
| 459044 ||  || — || December 31, 2007 || Mount Lemmon || Mount Lemmon Survey || — || align=right data-sort-value="0.96" | 960 m || 
|-id=045 bgcolor=#fefefe
| 459045 ||  || — || March 10, 2005 || Anderson Mesa || LONEOS || — || align=right | 1.1 km || 
|-id=046 bgcolor=#FFC2E0
| 459046 ||  || — || January 11, 2012 || Mount Lemmon || Mount Lemmon Survey || APO +1km || align=right | 1.2 km || 
|-id=047 bgcolor=#fefefe
| 459047 ||  || — || December 4, 2007 || Kitt Peak || Spacewatch || MAS || align=right data-sort-value="0.81" | 810 m || 
|-id=048 bgcolor=#E9E9E9
| 459048 ||  || — || July 27, 2009 || Kitt Peak || Spacewatch || — || align=right | 1.9 km || 
|-id=049 bgcolor=#fefefe
| 459049 ||  || — || December 4, 2007 || Kitt Peak || Spacewatch || NYS || align=right data-sort-value="0.72" | 720 m || 
|-id=050 bgcolor=#E9E9E9
| 459050 ||  || — || January 13, 2008 || Catalina || CSS || — || align=right | 1.1 km || 
|-id=051 bgcolor=#fefefe
| 459051 ||  || — || December 27, 2011 || Kitt Peak || Spacewatch || — || align=right data-sort-value="0.93" | 930 m || 
|-id=052 bgcolor=#fefefe
| 459052 ||  || — || April 12, 2005 || Kitt Peak || Spacewatch || — || align=right data-sort-value="0.76" | 760 m || 
|-id=053 bgcolor=#fefefe
| 459053 ||  || — || February 3, 2009 || Mount Lemmon || Mount Lemmon Survey || — || align=right | 1.3 km || 
|-id=054 bgcolor=#fefefe
| 459054 ||  || — || January 18, 2012 || Catalina || CSS || — || align=right data-sort-value="0.98" | 980 m || 
|-id=055 bgcolor=#E9E9E9
| 459055 ||  || — || December 18, 2007 || Mount Lemmon || Mount Lemmon Survey || — || align=right data-sort-value="0.94" | 940 m || 
|-id=056 bgcolor=#fefefe
| 459056 ||  || — || September 16, 2010 || Mount Lemmon || Mount Lemmon Survey || — || align=right data-sort-value="0.99" | 990 m || 
|-id=057 bgcolor=#E9E9E9
| 459057 ||  || — || January 19, 2012 || Kitt Peak || Spacewatch || — || align=right | 1.4 km || 
|-id=058 bgcolor=#fefefe
| 459058 ||  || — || December 16, 2007 || Catalina || CSS || — || align=right | 1.3 km || 
|-id=059 bgcolor=#E9E9E9
| 459059 ||  || — || September 10, 2010 || Mount Lemmon || Mount Lemmon Survey || EUN || align=right | 1.1 km || 
|-id=060 bgcolor=#fefefe
| 459060 ||  || — || December 18, 2007 || Mount Lemmon || Mount Lemmon Survey || — || align=right data-sort-value="0.76" | 760 m || 
|-id=061 bgcolor=#fefefe
| 459061 ||  || — || December 30, 2007 || Kitt Peak || Spacewatch || — || align=right data-sort-value="0.72" | 720 m || 
|-id=062 bgcolor=#E9E9E9
| 459062 ||  || — || January 18, 2008 || Mount Lemmon || Mount Lemmon Survey || EUN || align=right | 1.1 km || 
|-id=063 bgcolor=#fefefe
| 459063 ||  || — || December 17, 2003 || Kitt Peak || Spacewatch || — || align=right data-sort-value="0.83" | 830 m || 
|-id=064 bgcolor=#fefefe
| 459064 ||  || — || December 17, 2007 || Mount Lemmon || Mount Lemmon Survey || — || align=right data-sort-value="0.91" | 910 m || 
|-id=065 bgcolor=#fefefe
| 459065 ||  || — || January 4, 2012 || Mount Lemmon || Mount Lemmon Survey || — || align=right data-sort-value="0.96" | 960 m || 
|-id=066 bgcolor=#fefefe
| 459066 ||  || — || November 24, 2003 || Socorro || LINEAR || — || align=right data-sort-value="0.94" | 940 m || 
|-id=067 bgcolor=#fefefe
| 459067 ||  || — || January 19, 2012 || Kitt Peak || Spacewatch || — || align=right data-sort-value="0.98" | 980 m || 
|-id=068 bgcolor=#fefefe
| 459068 ||  || — || November 28, 2011 || Mount Lemmon || Mount Lemmon Survey || — || align=right data-sort-value="0.90" | 900 m || 
|-id=069 bgcolor=#E9E9E9
| 459069 ||  || — || November 22, 2006 || Catalina || CSS || GEF || align=right | 1.0 km || 
|-id=070 bgcolor=#fefefe
| 459070 ||  || — || December 16, 2007 || Mount Lemmon || Mount Lemmon Survey || — || align=right | 1.1 km || 
|-id=071 bgcolor=#fefefe
| 459071 ||  || — || November 26, 2003 || Kitt Peak || Spacewatch || — || align=right data-sort-value="0.75" | 750 m || 
|-id=072 bgcolor=#E9E9E9
| 459072 ||  || — || January 20, 2008 || Kitt Peak || Spacewatch || critical || align=right | 1.2 km || 
|-id=073 bgcolor=#E9E9E9
| 459073 ||  || — || February 7, 2008 || Kitt Peak || Spacewatch || — || align=right data-sort-value="0.82" | 820 m || 
|-id=074 bgcolor=#E9E9E9
| 459074 ||  || — || April 11, 2008 || Kitt Peak || Spacewatch || MRX || align=right data-sort-value="0.97" | 970 m || 
|-id=075 bgcolor=#E9E9E9
| 459075 ||  || — || December 27, 2011 || Mount Lemmon || Mount Lemmon Survey || — || align=right | 1.2 km || 
|-id=076 bgcolor=#E9E9E9
| 459076 ||  || — || February 9, 2008 || Kitt Peak || Spacewatch || KON || align=right | 2.1 km || 
|-id=077 bgcolor=#E9E9E9
| 459077 ||  || — || December 27, 2011 || Mount Lemmon || Mount Lemmon Survey || — || align=right | 1.7 km || 
|-id=078 bgcolor=#E9E9E9
| 459078 ||  || — || January 21, 2012 || Kitt Peak || Spacewatch || — || align=right | 1.9 km || 
|-id=079 bgcolor=#E9E9E9
| 459079 ||  || — || June 13, 2004 || Kitt Peak || Spacewatch || — || align=right | 1.4 km || 
|-id=080 bgcolor=#E9E9E9
| 459080 ||  || — || November 1, 2010 || Mount Lemmon || Mount Lemmon Survey || — || align=right | 2.1 km || 
|-id=081 bgcolor=#E9E9E9
| 459081 ||  || — || February 28, 2008 || Kitt Peak || Spacewatch || — || align=right | 2.1 km || 
|-id=082 bgcolor=#fefefe
| 459082 ||  || — || December 31, 2007 || Mount Lemmon || Mount Lemmon Survey || — || align=right data-sort-value="0.71" | 710 m || 
|-id=083 bgcolor=#E9E9E9
| 459083 ||  || — || March 2, 2008 || Mount Lemmon || Mount Lemmon Survey || — || align=right | 1.9 km || 
|-id=084 bgcolor=#E9E9E9
| 459084 ||  || — || September 3, 2010 || Mount Lemmon || Mount Lemmon Survey || NEM || align=right | 2.1 km || 
|-id=085 bgcolor=#fefefe
| 459085 ||  || — || March 3, 2005 || Catalina || CSS || — || align=right data-sort-value="0.70" | 700 m || 
|-id=086 bgcolor=#E9E9E9
| 459086 ||  || — || January 21, 2012 || Kitt Peak || Spacewatch || MAR || align=right data-sort-value="0.80" | 800 m || 
|-id=087 bgcolor=#fefefe
| 459087 ||  || — || December 4, 2007 || Mount Lemmon || Mount Lemmon Survey || — || align=right data-sort-value="0.65" | 650 m || 
|-id=088 bgcolor=#fefefe
| 459088 ||  || — || December 13, 2007 || Socorro || LINEAR || — || align=right data-sort-value="0.96" | 960 m || 
|-id=089 bgcolor=#fefefe
| 459089 ||  || — || January 3, 2012 || Kitt Peak || Spacewatch || — || align=right data-sort-value="0.92" | 920 m || 
|-id=090 bgcolor=#fefefe
| 459090 ||  || — || September 3, 2010 || Mount Lemmon || Mount Lemmon Survey || — || align=right data-sort-value="0.76" | 760 m || 
|-id=091 bgcolor=#fefefe
| 459091 ||  || — || April 28, 2009 || Kitt Peak || Spacewatch || — || align=right data-sort-value="0.74" | 740 m || 
|-id=092 bgcolor=#E9E9E9
| 459092 ||  || — || August 28, 2006 || Kitt Peak || Spacewatch || (5) || align=right data-sort-value="0.64" | 640 m || 
|-id=093 bgcolor=#fefefe
| 459093 ||  || — || September 26, 2006 || Kitt Peak || Spacewatch || — || align=right data-sort-value="0.79" | 790 m || 
|-id=094 bgcolor=#fefefe
| 459094 ||  || — || December 20, 2007 || Mount Lemmon || Mount Lemmon Survey || — || align=right data-sort-value="0.80" | 800 m || 
|-id=095 bgcolor=#fefefe
| 459095 ||  || — || November 11, 2007 || Mount Lemmon || Mount Lemmon Survey || — || align=right data-sort-value="0.83" | 830 m || 
|-id=096 bgcolor=#E9E9E9
| 459096 ||  || — || January 10, 2008 || Mount Lemmon || Mount Lemmon Survey || — || align=right data-sort-value="0.78" | 780 m || 
|-id=097 bgcolor=#E9E9E9
| 459097 ||  || — || January 26, 2012 || Kitt Peak || Spacewatch || — || align=right | 1.6 km || 
|-id=098 bgcolor=#E9E9E9
| 459098 ||  || — || February 27, 2008 || Mount Lemmon || Mount Lemmon Survey || NEM || align=right | 1.7 km || 
|-id=099 bgcolor=#E9E9E9
| 459099 ||  || — || September 3, 2010 || Mount Lemmon || Mount Lemmon Survey || — || align=right | 1.0 km || 
|-id=100 bgcolor=#E9E9E9
| 459100 ||  || — || February 11, 2008 || Mount Lemmon || Mount Lemmon Survey || — || align=right data-sort-value="0.87" | 870 m || 
|}

459101–459200 

|-bgcolor=#fefefe
| 459101 ||  || — || December 20, 2004 || Mount Lemmon || Mount Lemmon Survey || — || align=right data-sort-value="0.89" | 890 m || 
|-id=102 bgcolor=#fefefe
| 459102 ||  || — || March 10, 2005 || Kitt Peak || Spacewatch || NYS || align=right data-sort-value="0.66" | 660 m || 
|-id=103 bgcolor=#E9E9E9
| 459103 ||  || — || March 11, 2008 || Mount Lemmon || Mount Lemmon Survey || — || align=right | 1.7 km || 
|-id=104 bgcolor=#fefefe
| 459104 ||  || — || December 19, 2007 || Mount Lemmon || Mount Lemmon Survey || — || align=right data-sort-value="0.81" | 810 m || 
|-id=105 bgcolor=#E9E9E9
| 459105 ||  || — || November 23, 2006 || Mount Lemmon || Mount Lemmon Survey || — || align=right | 1.3 km || 
|-id=106 bgcolor=#E9E9E9
| 459106 ||  || — || February 2, 2008 || Kitt Peak || Spacewatch || — || align=right | 1.4 km || 
|-id=107 bgcolor=#fefefe
| 459107 ||  || — || January 10, 2008 || Kitt Peak || Spacewatch || — || align=right data-sort-value="0.80" | 800 m || 
|-id=108 bgcolor=#E9E9E9
| 459108 ||  || — || January 27, 2012 || Kitt Peak || Spacewatch || BRG || align=right | 1.2 km || 
|-id=109 bgcolor=#E9E9E9
| 459109 ||  || — || September 28, 1994 || Kitt Peak || Spacewatch || — || align=right data-sort-value="0.75" | 750 m || 
|-id=110 bgcolor=#E9E9E9
| 459110 ||  || — || February 12, 2004 || Kitt Peak || Spacewatch || (5) || align=right data-sort-value="0.71" | 710 m || 
|-id=111 bgcolor=#fefefe
| 459111 ||  || — || November 28, 2011 || Mount Lemmon || Mount Lemmon Survey || — || align=right data-sort-value="0.85" | 850 m || 
|-id=112 bgcolor=#E9E9E9
| 459112 ||  || — || March 28, 2004 || Kitt Peak || Spacewatch || — || align=right | 1.2 km || 
|-id=113 bgcolor=#E9E9E9
| 459113 ||  || — || January 31, 2008 || Kitt Peak || Spacewatch || — || align=right data-sort-value="0.80" | 800 m || 
|-id=114 bgcolor=#E9E9E9
| 459114 ||  || — || July 5, 2005 || Kitt Peak || Spacewatch || MAR || align=right | 1.2 km || 
|-id=115 bgcolor=#fefefe
| 459115 ||  || — || January 29, 2012 || Kitt Peak || Spacewatch || — || align=right | 2.5 km || 
|-id=116 bgcolor=#E9E9E9
| 459116 ||  || — || March 4, 2008 || Kitt Peak || Spacewatch || — || align=right | 1.1 km || 
|-id=117 bgcolor=#fefefe
| 459117 ||  || — || December 30, 2011 || Catalina || CSS || H || align=right data-sort-value="0.78" | 780 m || 
|-id=118 bgcolor=#E9E9E9
| 459118 ||  || — || October 4, 2005 || Catalina || CSS || — || align=right | 2.5 km || 
|-id=119 bgcolor=#FFC2E0
| 459119 ||  || — || January 19, 2012 || Mount Lemmon || Mount Lemmon Survey || APO +1km || align=right data-sort-value="0.81" | 810 m || 
|-id=120 bgcolor=#E9E9E9
| 459120 ||  || — || September 28, 2006 || Kitt Peak || Spacewatch || — || align=right | 1.1 km || 
|-id=121 bgcolor=#E9E9E9
| 459121 ||  || — || October 20, 2006 || Mount Lemmon || Mount Lemmon Survey || — || align=right data-sort-value="0.91" | 910 m || 
|-id=122 bgcolor=#E9E9E9
| 459122 ||  || — || January 14, 2012 || Kitt Peak || Spacewatch || (5) || align=right data-sort-value="0.81" | 810 m || 
|-id=123 bgcolor=#fefefe
| 459123 ||  || — || March 4, 2005 || Catalina || CSS || — || align=right | 1.0 km || 
|-id=124 bgcolor=#fefefe
| 459124 ||  || — || December 27, 2011 || Mount Lemmon || Mount Lemmon Survey || — || align=right data-sort-value="0.70" | 700 m || 
|-id=125 bgcolor=#E9E9E9
| 459125 ||  || — || January 31, 2012 || Catalina || CSS || — || align=right | 1.1 km || 
|-id=126 bgcolor=#fefefe
| 459126 ||  || — || May 4, 2005 || Kitt Peak || Spacewatch || NYS || align=right data-sort-value="0.65" | 650 m || 
|-id=127 bgcolor=#E9E9E9
| 459127 ||  || — || February 1, 2012 || Mount Lemmon || Mount Lemmon Survey || — || align=right | 1.3 km || 
|-id=128 bgcolor=#E9E9E9
| 459128 ||  || — || March 15, 2004 || Kitt Peak || Spacewatch || — || align=right | 1.0 km || 
|-id=129 bgcolor=#E9E9E9
| 459129 ||  || — || January 18, 2012 || Kitt Peak || Spacewatch || — || align=right | 2.5 km || 
|-id=130 bgcolor=#d6d6d6
| 459130 ||  || — || January 19, 2012 || Kitt Peak || Spacewatch || EOS || align=right | 1.9 km || 
|-id=131 bgcolor=#E9E9E9
| 459131 ||  || — || December 28, 2011 || Mount Lemmon || Mount Lemmon Survey || — || align=right | 1.8 km || 
|-id=132 bgcolor=#E9E9E9
| 459132 ||  || — || January 19, 2012 || Kitt Peak || Spacewatch || — || align=right | 1.3 km || 
|-id=133 bgcolor=#E9E9E9
| 459133 ||  || — || November 1, 2006 || Catalina || CSS || — || align=right | 1.6 km || 
|-id=134 bgcolor=#E9E9E9
| 459134 ||  || — || April 16, 2004 || Kitt Peak || Spacewatch || — || align=right data-sort-value="0.65" | 650 m || 
|-id=135 bgcolor=#E9E9E9
| 459135 ||  || — || January 21, 2012 || Kitt Peak || Spacewatch || — || align=right | 1.2 km || 
|-id=136 bgcolor=#E9E9E9
| 459136 ||  || — || February 2, 2008 || Kitt Peak || Spacewatch || — || align=right | 1.1 km || 
|-id=137 bgcolor=#E9E9E9
| 459137 ||  || — || October 3, 2006 || Mount Lemmon || Mount Lemmon Survey || (5) || align=right data-sort-value="0.60" | 600 m || 
|-id=138 bgcolor=#E9E9E9
| 459138 ||  || — || April 8, 2008 || Kitt Peak || Spacewatch || — || align=right | 1.2 km || 
|-id=139 bgcolor=#E9E9E9
| 459139 ||  || — || March 7, 2008 || Mount Lemmon || Mount Lemmon Survey || — || align=right | 1.5 km || 
|-id=140 bgcolor=#E9E9E9
| 459140 ||  || — || December 27, 2011 || Mount Lemmon || Mount Lemmon Survey || MAR || align=right | 1.0 km || 
|-id=141 bgcolor=#E9E9E9
| 459141 ||  || — || January 18, 2012 || Kitt Peak || Spacewatch || — || align=right | 1.2 km || 
|-id=142 bgcolor=#fefefe
| 459142 ||  || — || January 11, 2008 || Kitt Peak || Spacewatch || — || align=right data-sort-value="0.91" | 910 m || 
|-id=143 bgcolor=#E9E9E9
| 459143 ||  || — || January 1, 2012 || Mount Lemmon || Mount Lemmon Survey || — || align=right | 1.0 km || 
|-id=144 bgcolor=#fefefe
| 459144 ||  || — || March 24, 2009 || Kitt Peak || Spacewatch || — || align=right data-sort-value="0.98" | 980 m || 
|-id=145 bgcolor=#E9E9E9
| 459145 ||  || — || March 2, 2008 || Kitt Peak || Spacewatch || — || align=right | 1.1 km || 
|-id=146 bgcolor=#E9E9E9
| 459146 ||  || — || April 11, 2008 || Mount Lemmon || Mount Lemmon Survey || — || align=right | 2.0 km || 
|-id=147 bgcolor=#fefefe
| 459147 ||  || — || January 19, 2012 || Kitt Peak || Spacewatch || — || align=right data-sort-value="0.69" | 690 m || 
|-id=148 bgcolor=#E9E9E9
| 459148 ||  || — || February 13, 2012 || Kitt Peak || Spacewatch || — || align=right | 1.4 km || 
|-id=149 bgcolor=#E9E9E9
| 459149 ||  || — || March 30, 2008 || Catalina || CSS || — || align=right | 1.8 km || 
|-id=150 bgcolor=#fefefe
| 459150 ||  || — || October 21, 1995 || Kitt Peak || Spacewatch || — || align=right data-sort-value="0.70" | 700 m || 
|-id=151 bgcolor=#E9E9E9
| 459151 ||  || — || February 7, 2008 || Kitt Peak || Spacewatch || — || align=right | 1.0 km || 
|-id=152 bgcolor=#E9E9E9
| 459152 ||  || — || April 5, 2008 || Mount Lemmon || Mount Lemmon Survey || — || align=right | 1.2 km || 
|-id=153 bgcolor=#E9E9E9
| 459153 ||  || — || February 8, 2008 || Mount Lemmon || Mount Lemmon Survey || — || align=right | 1.0 km || 
|-id=154 bgcolor=#fefefe
| 459154 ||  || — || February 2, 2012 || Kitt Peak || Spacewatch || NYS || align=right data-sort-value="0.66" | 660 m || 
|-id=155 bgcolor=#E9E9E9
| 459155 ||  || — || February 7, 2008 || Mount Lemmon || Mount Lemmon Survey || — || align=right data-sort-value="0.84" | 840 m || 
|-id=156 bgcolor=#FA8072
| 459156 ||  || — || July 5, 2005 || Kitt Peak || Spacewatch || — || align=right data-sort-value="0.78" | 780 m || 
|-id=157 bgcolor=#fefefe
| 459157 ||  || — || January 21, 2012 || Kitt Peak || Spacewatch || — || align=right data-sort-value="0.79" | 790 m || 
|-id=158 bgcolor=#E9E9E9
| 459158 ||  || — || February 10, 2008 || Kitt Peak || Spacewatch || BRG || align=right | 1.2 km || 
|-id=159 bgcolor=#E9E9E9
| 459159 ||  || — || February 2, 2008 || Kitt Peak || Spacewatch || — || align=right data-sort-value="0.64" | 640 m || 
|-id=160 bgcolor=#E9E9E9
| 459160 ||  || — || February 8, 2008 || Kitt Peak || Spacewatch || — || align=right data-sort-value="0.81" | 810 m || 
|-id=161 bgcolor=#E9E9E9
| 459161 ||  || — || September 18, 2006 || Kitt Peak || Spacewatch || — || align=right data-sort-value="0.94" | 940 m || 
|-id=162 bgcolor=#E9E9E9
| 459162 ||  || — || February 19, 2012 || Kitt Peak || Spacewatch || — || align=right data-sort-value="0.88" | 880 m || 
|-id=163 bgcolor=#E9E9E9
| 459163 ||  || — || January 30, 2012 || Kitt Peak || Spacewatch || — || align=right | 1.5 km || 
|-id=164 bgcolor=#fefefe
| 459164 ||  || — || January 10, 2008 || Mount Lemmon || Mount Lemmon Survey || — || align=right data-sort-value="0.90" | 900 m || 
|-id=165 bgcolor=#E9E9E9
| 459165 ||  || — || February 21, 2007 || Kitt Peak || Spacewatch || — || align=right | 2.2 km || 
|-id=166 bgcolor=#E9E9E9
| 459166 ||  || — || April 5, 2008 || Kitt Peak || Spacewatch || — || align=right | 1.4 km || 
|-id=167 bgcolor=#E9E9E9
| 459167 ||  || — || March 30, 2008 || Catalina || CSS || — || align=right | 1.6 km || 
|-id=168 bgcolor=#E9E9E9
| 459168 ||  || — || November 3, 2010 || Mount Lemmon || Mount Lemmon Survey || — || align=right | 1.7 km || 
|-id=169 bgcolor=#E9E9E9
| 459169 ||  || — || October 6, 2005 || Kitt Peak || Spacewatch || — || align=right | 1.5 km || 
|-id=170 bgcolor=#E9E9E9
| 459170 ||  || — || January 19, 2012 || Mount Lemmon || Mount Lemmon Survey || — || align=right data-sort-value="0.91" | 910 m || 
|-id=171 bgcolor=#E9E9E9
| 459171 ||  || — || May 3, 2008 || Mount Lemmon || Mount Lemmon Survey || — || align=right data-sort-value="0.92" | 920 m || 
|-id=172 bgcolor=#E9E9E9
| 459172 ||  || — || February 21, 2012 || Kitt Peak || Spacewatch || — || align=right | 1.7 km || 
|-id=173 bgcolor=#d6d6d6
| 459173 ||  || — || March 25, 2007 || Mount Lemmon || Mount Lemmon Survey || — || align=right | 2.9 km || 
|-id=174 bgcolor=#E9E9E9
| 459174 ||  || — || February 21, 2012 || Kitt Peak || Spacewatch || — || align=right | 1.3 km || 
|-id=175 bgcolor=#E9E9E9
| 459175 ||  || — || April 16, 2008 || Mount Lemmon || Mount Lemmon Survey || — || align=right | 1.7 km || 
|-id=176 bgcolor=#E9E9E9
| 459176 ||  || — || April 27, 2008 || Mount Lemmon || Mount Lemmon Survey || — || align=right | 1.3 km || 
|-id=177 bgcolor=#d6d6d6
| 459177 ||  || — || February 22, 2012 || Kitt Peak || Spacewatch || — || align=right | 3.1 km || 
|-id=178 bgcolor=#E9E9E9
| 459178 ||  || — || September 30, 2006 || Mount Lemmon || Mount Lemmon Survey || — || align=right data-sort-value="0.82" | 820 m || 
|-id=179 bgcolor=#E9E9E9
| 459179 ||  || — || November 19, 2006 || Kitt Peak || Spacewatch || — || align=right | 1.2 km || 
|-id=180 bgcolor=#E9E9E9
| 459180 ||  || — || March 31, 2008 || Mount Lemmon || Mount Lemmon Survey || — || align=right | 1.2 km || 
|-id=181 bgcolor=#E9E9E9
| 459181 ||  || — || March 31, 2008 || Kitt Peak || Spacewatch || — || align=right | 1.2 km || 
|-id=182 bgcolor=#E9E9E9
| 459182 ||  || — || November 1, 2010 || Mount Lemmon || Mount Lemmon Survey || — || align=right data-sort-value="0.77" | 770 m || 
|-id=183 bgcolor=#E9E9E9
| 459183 ||  || — || January 5, 2011 || Catalina || CSS || — || align=right | 1.8 km || 
|-id=184 bgcolor=#E9E9E9
| 459184 ||  || — || March 12, 2008 || Kitt Peak || Spacewatch || — || align=right data-sort-value="0.76" | 760 m || 
|-id=185 bgcolor=#E9E9E9
| 459185 ||  || — || September 18, 2010 || Mount Lemmon || Mount Lemmon Survey || ADE || align=right | 1.8 km || 
|-id=186 bgcolor=#E9E9E9
| 459186 ||  || — || December 24, 2006 || Mount Lemmon || Mount Lemmon Survey || — || align=right | 2.0 km || 
|-id=187 bgcolor=#E9E9E9
| 459187 ||  || — || May 4, 2008 || Kitt Peak || Spacewatch || EUN || align=right | 1.0 km || 
|-id=188 bgcolor=#E9E9E9
| 459188 ||  || — || February 26, 2012 || Mount Lemmon || Mount Lemmon Survey || — || align=right | 1.3 km || 
|-id=189 bgcolor=#E9E9E9
| 459189 ||  || — || July 2, 2010 || WISE || WISE || — || align=right | 3.5 km || 
|-id=190 bgcolor=#FA8072
| 459190 ||  || — || August 17, 1998 || Socorro || LINEAR || — || align=right | 1.1 km || 
|-id=191 bgcolor=#E9E9E9
| 459191 ||  || — || February 2, 2008 || Mount Lemmon || Mount Lemmon Survey || — || align=right data-sort-value="0.80" | 800 m || 
|-id=192 bgcolor=#fefefe
| 459192 ||  || — || December 31, 2007 || Mount Lemmon || Mount Lemmon Survey || — || align=right data-sort-value="0.82" | 820 m || 
|-id=193 bgcolor=#E9E9E9
| 459193 ||  || — || November 3, 2010 || Mount Lemmon || Mount Lemmon Survey || — || align=right | 1.7 km || 
|-id=194 bgcolor=#E9E9E9
| 459194 ||  || — || February 1, 2012 || Kitt Peak || Spacewatch || — || align=right | 1.3 km || 
|-id=195 bgcolor=#E9E9E9
| 459195 ||  || — || February 22, 2012 || Kitt Peak || Spacewatch || — || align=right | 1.5 km || 
|-id=196 bgcolor=#E9E9E9
| 459196 ||  || — || December 27, 2011 || Mount Lemmon || Mount Lemmon Survey || MAR || align=right | 1.5 km || 
|-id=197 bgcolor=#E9E9E9
| 459197 ||  || — || February 25, 2012 || Mount Lemmon || Mount Lemmon Survey || — || align=right data-sort-value="0.86" | 860 m || 
|-id=198 bgcolor=#E9E9E9
| 459198 ||  || — || November 3, 2010 || Kitt Peak || Spacewatch || — || align=right | 1.7 km || 
|-id=199 bgcolor=#E9E9E9
| 459199 ||  || — || February 21, 2012 || Kitt Peak || Spacewatch || — || align=right | 2.0 km || 
|-id=200 bgcolor=#FFC2E0
| 459200 ||  || — || February 23, 2012 || Kitt Peak || Spacewatch || AMO || align=right data-sort-value="0.22" | 220 m || 
|}

459201–459300 

|-bgcolor=#E9E9E9
| 459201 ||  || — || January 30, 2012 || Kitt Peak || Spacewatch || — || align=right | 2.8 km || 
|-id=202 bgcolor=#d6d6d6
| 459202 ||  || — || February 24, 2012 || Kitt Peak || Spacewatch || NAE || align=right | 2.6 km || 
|-id=203 bgcolor=#E9E9E9
| 459203 ||  || — || October 13, 2010 || Mount Lemmon || Mount Lemmon Survey || — || align=right | 1.6 km || 
|-id=204 bgcolor=#E9E9E9
| 459204 ||  || — || September 26, 2006 || Kitt Peak || Spacewatch || (5) || align=right data-sort-value="0.63" | 630 m || 
|-id=205 bgcolor=#fefefe
| 459205 ||  || — || December 31, 2007 || Kitt Peak || Spacewatch || NYS || align=right data-sort-value="0.60" | 600 m || 
|-id=206 bgcolor=#E9E9E9
| 459206 ||  || — || February 27, 2012 || Kitt Peak || Spacewatch || — || align=right | 1.3 km || 
|-id=207 bgcolor=#fefefe
| 459207 ||  || — || January 1, 2008 || Kitt Peak || Spacewatch || — || align=right | 1.00 km || 
|-id=208 bgcolor=#E9E9E9
| 459208 ||  || — || February 2, 2008 || Mount Lemmon || Mount Lemmon Survey || — || align=right data-sort-value="0.96" | 960 m || 
|-id=209 bgcolor=#E9E9E9
| 459209 ||  || — || May 9, 2004 || Kitt Peak || Spacewatch || — || align=right | 1.2 km || 
|-id=210 bgcolor=#E9E9E9
| 459210 ||  || — || March 11, 2008 || Mount Lemmon || Mount Lemmon Survey || — || align=right | 1.2 km || 
|-id=211 bgcolor=#fefefe
| 459211 ||  || — || February 7, 2008 || Kitt Peak || Spacewatch || — || align=right data-sort-value="0.81" | 810 m || 
|-id=212 bgcolor=#E9E9E9
| 459212 ||  || — || December 27, 2011 || Mount Lemmon || Mount Lemmon Survey || — || align=right | 1.2 km || 
|-id=213 bgcolor=#E9E9E9
| 459213 ||  || — || September 29, 2005 || Kitt Peak || Spacewatch || — || align=right | 1.6 km || 
|-id=214 bgcolor=#E9E9E9
| 459214 ||  || — || March 16, 2007 || Kitt Peak || Spacewatch || — || align=right | 2.4 km || 
|-id=215 bgcolor=#E9E9E9
| 459215 ||  || — || February 23, 2012 || Mount Lemmon || Mount Lemmon Survey || — || align=right data-sort-value="0.71" | 710 m || 
|-id=216 bgcolor=#E9E9E9
| 459216 ||  || — || September 30, 2005 || Catalina || CSS || — || align=right | 2.9 km || 
|-id=217 bgcolor=#E9E9E9
| 459217 ||  || — || March 8, 2008 || Kitt Peak || Spacewatch || EUN || align=right data-sort-value="0.99" | 990 m || 
|-id=218 bgcolor=#E9E9E9
| 459218 ||  || — || February 21, 2012 || Mount Lemmon || Mount Lemmon Survey || — || align=right | 1.8 km || 
|-id=219 bgcolor=#E9E9E9
| 459219 ||  || — || April 26, 2003 || Kitt Peak || Spacewatch || — || align=right | 1.6 km || 
|-id=220 bgcolor=#E9E9E9
| 459220 ||  || — || March 7, 2008 || Catalina || CSS || — || align=right | 1.2 km || 
|-id=221 bgcolor=#fefefe
| 459221 ||  || — || February 7, 2008 || Kitt Peak || Spacewatch || NYS || align=right data-sort-value="0.65" | 650 m || 
|-id=222 bgcolor=#E9E9E9
| 459222 ||  || — || March 11, 2008 || Kitt Peak || Spacewatch || — || align=right | 1.4 km || 
|-id=223 bgcolor=#E9E9E9
| 459223 ||  || — || February 23, 2012 || Mount Lemmon || Mount Lemmon Survey || — || align=right | 1.3 km || 
|-id=224 bgcolor=#E9E9E9
| 459224 ||  || — || June 30, 2005 || Kitt Peak || Spacewatch || — || align=right | 1.4 km || 
|-id=225 bgcolor=#E9E9E9
| 459225 ||  || — || February 18, 2012 || Catalina || CSS || EUN || align=right | 1.1 km || 
|-id=226 bgcolor=#E9E9E9
| 459226 ||  || — || April 30, 2008 || Kitt Peak || Spacewatch || — || align=right | 1.9 km || 
|-id=227 bgcolor=#E9E9E9
| 459227 ||  || — || February 21, 2012 || Mount Lemmon || Mount Lemmon Survey || — || align=right | 2.4 km || 
|-id=228 bgcolor=#E9E9E9
| 459228 ||  || — || April 4, 2008 || Mount Lemmon || Mount Lemmon Survey || — || align=right | 1.2 km || 
|-id=229 bgcolor=#fefefe
| 459229 ||  || — || July 5, 2005 || Siding Spring || SSS || — || align=right | 1.2 km || 
|-id=230 bgcolor=#E9E9E9
| 459230 ||  || — || September 4, 2010 || Kitt Peak || Spacewatch || — || align=right | 1.5 km || 
|-id=231 bgcolor=#E9E9E9
| 459231 ||  || — || February 10, 2008 || Kitt Peak || Spacewatch || — || align=right | 1.2 km || 
|-id=232 bgcolor=#E9E9E9
| 459232 ||  || — || November 22, 2006 || Kitt Peak || Spacewatch || — || align=right | 1.4 km || 
|-id=233 bgcolor=#E9E9E9
| 459233 ||  || — || March 15, 2012 || Mount Lemmon || Mount Lemmon Survey || ADE || align=right | 1.8 km || 
|-id=234 bgcolor=#E9E9E9
| 459234 ||  || — || March 10, 2008 || Kitt Peak || Spacewatch || ADE || align=right | 1.3 km || 
|-id=235 bgcolor=#E9E9E9
| 459235 ||  || — || October 12, 2010 || Kitt Peak || Spacewatch || — || align=right | 1.5 km || 
|-id=236 bgcolor=#E9E9E9
| 459236 ||  || — || December 15, 2006 || Kitt Peak || Spacewatch || JUN || align=right | 1.1 km || 
|-id=237 bgcolor=#E9E9E9
| 459237 ||  || — || April 19, 2004 || Kitt Peak || Spacewatch || — || align=right data-sort-value="0.69" | 690 m || 
|-id=238 bgcolor=#d6d6d6
| 459238 ||  || — || December 29, 2005 || Kitt Peak || Spacewatch || EMA || align=right | 3.5 km || 
|-id=239 bgcolor=#E9E9E9
| 459239 ||  || — || October 3, 2005 || Kitt Peak || Spacewatch || EUN || align=right | 1.2 km || 
|-id=240 bgcolor=#E9E9E9
| 459240 ||  || — || August 15, 2009 || Kitt Peak || Spacewatch || — || align=right | 2.7 km || 
|-id=241 bgcolor=#E9E9E9
| 459241 ||  || — || January 13, 2008 || Kitt Peak || Spacewatch || — || align=right | 2.2 km || 
|-id=242 bgcolor=#E9E9E9
| 459242 ||  || — || February 24, 2012 || Kitt Peak || Spacewatch || — || align=right | 2.5 km || 
|-id=243 bgcolor=#E9E9E9
| 459243 ||  || — || November 1, 2006 || Kitt Peak || Spacewatch || (5) || align=right data-sort-value="0.72" | 720 m || 
|-id=244 bgcolor=#d6d6d6
| 459244 ||  || — || November 30, 2005 || Mount Lemmon || Mount Lemmon Survey || — || align=right | 1.7 km || 
|-id=245 bgcolor=#E9E9E9
| 459245 ||  || — || February 25, 2012 || Kitt Peak || Spacewatch || MAR || align=right data-sort-value="0.83" | 830 m || 
|-id=246 bgcolor=#E9E9E9
| 459246 ||  || — || February 22, 2012 || Kitt Peak || Spacewatch || — || align=right | 2.8 km || 
|-id=247 bgcolor=#E9E9E9
| 459247 ||  || — || April 1, 2008 || Kitt Peak || Spacewatch || — || align=right | 1.1 km || 
|-id=248 bgcolor=#E9E9E9
| 459248 ||  || — || January 17, 2007 || Kitt Peak || Spacewatch || — || align=right | 1.8 km || 
|-id=249 bgcolor=#E9E9E9
| 459249 ||  || — || May 5, 2008 || Kitt Peak || Spacewatch || EUN || align=right | 1.2 km || 
|-id=250 bgcolor=#d6d6d6
| 459250 ||  || — || February 26, 2012 || Kitt Peak || Spacewatch || — || align=right | 3.3 km || 
|-id=251 bgcolor=#E9E9E9
| 459251 ||  || — || March 31, 2003 || Kitt Peak || Spacewatch || DOR || align=right | 1.7 km || 
|-id=252 bgcolor=#E9E9E9
| 459252 ||  || — || January 11, 1994 || Kitt Peak || Spacewatch || — || align=right | 1.3 km || 
|-id=253 bgcolor=#fefefe
| 459253 ||  || — || October 8, 2010 || Kitt Peak || Spacewatch || — || align=right data-sort-value="0.92" | 920 m || 
|-id=254 bgcolor=#d6d6d6
| 459254 ||  || — || December 30, 2005 || Mount Lemmon || Mount Lemmon Survey || — || align=right | 2.7 km || 
|-id=255 bgcolor=#E9E9E9
| 459255 ||  || — || November 6, 2005 || Mount Lemmon || Mount Lemmon Survey || — || align=right | 1.8 km || 
|-id=256 bgcolor=#E9E9E9
| 459256 ||  || — || March 5, 2008 || Kitt Peak || Spacewatch || — || align=right data-sort-value="0.78" | 780 m || 
|-id=257 bgcolor=#d6d6d6
| 459257 ||  || — || March 13, 2012 || Mount Lemmon || Mount Lemmon Survey || — || align=right | 1.9 km || 
|-id=258 bgcolor=#E9E9E9
| 459258 ||  || — || April 7, 2003 || Kitt Peak || Spacewatch || — || align=right | 1.7 km || 
|-id=259 bgcolor=#d6d6d6
| 459259 ||  || — || March 29, 2007 || Kitt Peak || Spacewatch || — || align=right | 1.9 km || 
|-id=260 bgcolor=#d6d6d6
| 459260 ||  || — || March 16, 2012 || Kitt Peak || Spacewatch || — || align=right | 2.5 km || 
|-id=261 bgcolor=#d6d6d6
| 459261 ||  || — || October 9, 2004 || Kitt Peak || Spacewatch || — || align=right | 2.6 km || 
|-id=262 bgcolor=#E9E9E9
| 459262 ||  || — || September 19, 2009 || Mount Lemmon || Mount Lemmon Survey || WIT || align=right data-sort-value="0.86" | 860 m || 
|-id=263 bgcolor=#E9E9E9
| 459263 ||  || — || March 16, 2012 || Kitt Peak || Spacewatch || — || align=right | 1.8 km || 
|-id=264 bgcolor=#E9E9E9
| 459264 ||  || — || May 3, 2008 || Mount Lemmon || Mount Lemmon Survey || — || align=right | 1.2 km || 
|-id=265 bgcolor=#E9E9E9
| 459265 ||  || — || March 12, 2012 || Kitt Peak || Spacewatch || — || align=right | 1.5 km || 
|-id=266 bgcolor=#E9E9E9
| 459266 ||  || — || October 31, 2005 || Mount Lemmon || Mount Lemmon Survey || — || align=right | 3.0 km || 
|-id=267 bgcolor=#E9E9E9
| 459267 ||  || — || October 28, 2005 || Mount Lemmon || Mount Lemmon Survey || — || align=right | 1.6 km || 
|-id=268 bgcolor=#d6d6d6
| 459268 ||  || — || April 25, 2007 || Kitt Peak || Spacewatch || — || align=right | 2.9 km || 
|-id=269 bgcolor=#E9E9E9
| 459269 ||  || — || February 28, 2008 || Kitt Peak || Spacewatch || — || align=right data-sort-value="0.83" | 830 m || 
|-id=270 bgcolor=#E9E9E9
| 459270 ||  || — || December 15, 2006 || Kitt Peak || Spacewatch || — || align=right | 1.0 km || 
|-id=271 bgcolor=#E9E9E9
| 459271 ||  || — || January 9, 2007 || Kitt Peak || Spacewatch || critical || align=right | 1.1 km || 
|-id=272 bgcolor=#E9E9E9
| 459272 ||  || — || April 28, 2003 || Kitt Peak || Spacewatch || — || align=right | 2.2 km || 
|-id=273 bgcolor=#E9E9E9
| 459273 ||  || — || January 30, 2012 || Mount Lemmon || Mount Lemmon Survey || — || align=right | 2.4 km || 
|-id=274 bgcolor=#E9E9E9
| 459274 ||  || — || September 20, 2009 || Mount Lemmon || Mount Lemmon Survey || — || align=right | 1.6 km || 
|-id=275 bgcolor=#E9E9E9
| 459275 ||  || — || March 1, 2012 || Mount Lemmon || Mount Lemmon Survey || EUN || align=right | 1.4 km || 
|-id=276 bgcolor=#E9E9E9
| 459276 ||  || — || February 25, 2012 || Catalina || CSS || — || align=right | 1.7 km || 
|-id=277 bgcolor=#E9E9E9
| 459277 ||  || — || April 11, 2008 || Kitt Peak || Spacewatch || — || align=right | 1.3 km || 
|-id=278 bgcolor=#E9E9E9
| 459278 ||  || — || November 16, 2006 || Kitt Peak || Spacewatch || — || align=right | 1.2 km || 
|-id=279 bgcolor=#E9E9E9
| 459279 ||  || — || February 24, 2012 || Mount Lemmon || Mount Lemmon Survey || ADE || align=right | 1.8 km || 
|-id=280 bgcolor=#E9E9E9
| 459280 ||  || — || April 7, 2003 || Kitt Peak || Spacewatch || — || align=right | 1.9 km || 
|-id=281 bgcolor=#d6d6d6
| 459281 ||  || — || December 30, 2011 || Mount Lemmon || Mount Lemmon Survey || — || align=right | 3.9 km || 
|-id=282 bgcolor=#E9E9E9
| 459282 ||  || — || March 31, 2012 || Mount Lemmon || Mount Lemmon Survey || HOF || align=right | 2.3 km || 
|-id=283 bgcolor=#E9E9E9
| 459283 ||  || — || December 24, 2006 || Kitt Peak || Spacewatch || — || align=right | 1.4 km || 
|-id=284 bgcolor=#E9E9E9
| 459284 ||  || — || March 27, 2012 || Kitt Peak || Spacewatch || — || align=right | 2.3 km || 
|-id=285 bgcolor=#E9E9E9
| 459285 ||  || — || March 14, 2012 || Kitt Peak || Spacewatch || — || align=right | 1.4 km || 
|-id=286 bgcolor=#E9E9E9
| 459286 ||  || — || January 30, 2012 || Mount Lemmon || Mount Lemmon Survey || — || align=right | 2.1 km || 
|-id=287 bgcolor=#d6d6d6
| 459287 ||  || — || April 1, 2012 || Mount Lemmon || Mount Lemmon Survey || TEL || align=right | 1.4 km || 
|-id=288 bgcolor=#E9E9E9
| 459288 ||  || — || March 15, 2012 || Kitt Peak || Spacewatch || — || align=right | 1.7 km || 
|-id=289 bgcolor=#E9E9E9
| 459289 ||  || — || January 2, 2012 || Mount Lemmon || Mount Lemmon Survey || — || align=right | 3.1 km || 
|-id=290 bgcolor=#E9E9E9
| 459290 ||  || — || December 13, 2010 || Mount Lemmon || Mount Lemmon Survey || ADE || align=right | 1.9 km || 
|-id=291 bgcolor=#E9E9E9
| 459291 ||  || — || December 25, 2005 || Kitt Peak || Spacewatch || — || align=right | 2.5 km || 
|-id=292 bgcolor=#d6d6d6
| 459292 ||  || — || April 14, 2007 || Kitt Peak || Spacewatch || BRA || align=right | 1.9 km || 
|-id=293 bgcolor=#E9E9E9
| 459293 ||  || — || May 27, 2003 || Kitt Peak || Spacewatch || — || align=right | 2.2 km || 
|-id=294 bgcolor=#E9E9E9
| 459294 ||  || — || March 4, 2012 || Mount Lemmon || Mount Lemmon Survey || — || align=right | 1.7 km || 
|-id=295 bgcolor=#E9E9E9
| 459295 ||  || — || September 25, 2009 || Mount Lemmon || Mount Lemmon Survey || RAF || align=right data-sort-value="0.87" | 870 m || 
|-id=296 bgcolor=#E9E9E9
| 459296 ||  || — || December 1, 2010 || Mount Lemmon || Mount Lemmon Survey || — || align=right | 1.6 km || 
|-id=297 bgcolor=#E9E9E9
| 459297 ||  || — || April 10, 2003 || Kitt Peak || Spacewatch || — || align=right | 2.1 km || 
|-id=298 bgcolor=#E9E9E9
| 459298 ||  || — || October 7, 1996 || Kitt Peak || Spacewatch || — || align=right | 1.7 km || 
|-id=299 bgcolor=#E9E9E9
| 459299 ||  || — || November 18, 2006 || Mount Lemmon || Mount Lemmon Survey || — || align=right | 1.3 km || 
|-id=300 bgcolor=#E9E9E9
| 459300 ||  || — || January 8, 2011 || Mount Lemmon || Mount Lemmon Survey || — || align=right | 2.2 km || 
|}

459301–459400 

|-bgcolor=#E9E9E9
| 459301 ||  || — || February 10, 2007 || Catalina || CSS || — || align=right | 2.5 km || 
|-id=302 bgcolor=#E9E9E9
| 459302 ||  || — || September 30, 2005 || Mount Lemmon || Mount Lemmon Survey || — || align=right | 2.1 km || 
|-id=303 bgcolor=#E9E9E9
| 459303 ||  || — || February 24, 2012 || Mount Lemmon || Mount Lemmon Survey || — || align=right | 1.4 km || 
|-id=304 bgcolor=#E9E9E9
| 459304 ||  || — || March 4, 2012 || Mount Lemmon || Mount Lemmon Survey || — || align=right | 1.1 km || 
|-id=305 bgcolor=#E9E9E9
| 459305 ||  || — || March 27, 2012 || Mount Lemmon || Mount Lemmon Survey || — || align=right | 2.2 km || 
|-id=306 bgcolor=#E9E9E9
| 459306 ||  || — || March 28, 2012 || Mount Lemmon || Mount Lemmon Survey || — || align=right | 1.5 km || 
|-id=307 bgcolor=#E9E9E9
| 459307 ||  || — || March 31, 2008 || Mount Lemmon || Mount Lemmon Survey || MAR || align=right | 1.1 km || 
|-id=308 bgcolor=#E9E9E9
| 459308 ||  || — || April 11, 2012 || Mount Lemmon || Mount Lemmon Survey || — || align=right | 1.6 km || 
|-id=309 bgcolor=#d6d6d6
| 459309 ||  || — || November 19, 2009 || Mount Lemmon || Mount Lemmon Survey || EOS || align=right | 1.9 km || 
|-id=310 bgcolor=#d6d6d6
| 459310 ||  || — || January 22, 2006 || Mount Lemmon || Mount Lemmon Survey || — || align=right | 2.2 km || 
|-id=311 bgcolor=#d6d6d6
| 459311 ||  || — || September 29, 2008 || Mount Lemmon || Mount Lemmon Survey || — || align=right | 3.6 km || 
|-id=312 bgcolor=#E9E9E9
| 459312 ||  || — || August 28, 2005 || Kitt Peak || Spacewatch || EUN || align=right | 1.4 km || 
|-id=313 bgcolor=#E9E9E9
| 459313 ||  || — || March 30, 2012 || Kitt Peak || Spacewatch || — || align=right | 1.9 km || 
|-id=314 bgcolor=#d6d6d6
| 459314 ||  || — || January 28, 2011 || Mount Lemmon || Mount Lemmon Survey || — || align=right | 2.1 km || 
|-id=315 bgcolor=#E9E9E9
| 459315 ||  || — || October 24, 2009 || Mount Lemmon || Mount Lemmon Survey || DOR || align=right | 2.8 km || 
|-id=316 bgcolor=#E9E9E9
| 459316 ||  || — || March 30, 2012 || Mount Lemmon || Mount Lemmon Survey || — || align=right | 2.1 km || 
|-id=317 bgcolor=#E9E9E9
| 459317 ||  || — || March 15, 2012 || Catalina || CSS || — || align=right | 2.0 km || 
|-id=318 bgcolor=#E9E9E9
| 459318 ||  || — || April 16, 2012 || Catalina || CSS || — || align=right | 1.7 km || 
|-id=319 bgcolor=#d6d6d6
| 459319 ||  || — || December 9, 1999 || Kitt Peak || Spacewatch || — || align=right | 3.0 km || 
|-id=320 bgcolor=#d6d6d6
| 459320 ||  || — || March 1, 2010 || WISE || WISE || — || align=right | 3.7 km || 
|-id=321 bgcolor=#d6d6d6
| 459321 ||  || — || April 18, 2012 || Kitt Peak || Spacewatch || — || align=right | 3.8 km || 
|-id=322 bgcolor=#d6d6d6
| 459322 ||  || — || January 7, 2010 || Mount Lemmon || Mount Lemmon Survey || — || align=right | 3.3 km || 
|-id=323 bgcolor=#E9E9E9
| 459323 ||  || — || July 22, 1995 || Kitt Peak || Spacewatch || EUN || align=right | 1.4 km || 
|-id=324 bgcolor=#E9E9E9
| 459324 ||  || — || June 14, 2004 || Kitt Peak || Spacewatch || — || align=right | 1.5 km || 
|-id=325 bgcolor=#d6d6d6
| 459325 ||  || — || November 20, 2009 || Mount Lemmon || Mount Lemmon Survey || — || align=right | 3.1 km || 
|-id=326 bgcolor=#d6d6d6
| 459326 ||  || — || April 2, 2006 || Anderson Mesa || LONEOS || — || align=right | 3.3 km || 
|-id=327 bgcolor=#d6d6d6
| 459327 ||  || — || April 22, 2012 || Mount Lemmon || Mount Lemmon Survey || — || align=right | 3.4 km || 
|-id=328 bgcolor=#d6d6d6
| 459328 ||  || — || November 10, 2009 || Kitt Peak || Spacewatch || — || align=right | 2.9 km || 
|-id=329 bgcolor=#E9E9E9
| 459329 ||  || — || December 26, 2011 || Mount Lemmon || Mount Lemmon Survey || — || align=right | 1.2 km || 
|-id=330 bgcolor=#E9E9E9
| 459330 ||  || — || February 18, 2007 || Anderson Mesa || LONEOS || — || align=right | 2.3 km || 
|-id=331 bgcolor=#E9E9E9
| 459331 ||  || — || March 30, 2012 || Kitt Peak || Spacewatch || RAF || align=right data-sort-value="0.99" | 990 m || 
|-id=332 bgcolor=#E9E9E9
| 459332 ||  || — || December 27, 2006 || Mount Lemmon || Mount Lemmon Survey || — || align=right | 1.8 km || 
|-id=333 bgcolor=#d6d6d6
| 459333 ||  || — || December 11, 2009 || Mount Lemmon || Mount Lemmon Survey || — || align=right | 3.4 km || 
|-id=334 bgcolor=#E9E9E9
| 459334 ||  || — || September 17, 2010 || Mount Lemmon || Mount Lemmon Survey || — || align=right | 1.3 km || 
|-id=335 bgcolor=#E9E9E9
| 459335 ||  || — || November 26, 2011 || Mount Lemmon || Mount Lemmon Survey || — || align=right | 1.4 km || 
|-id=336 bgcolor=#E9E9E9
| 459336 ||  || — || April 13, 2012 || Siding Spring || SSS || — || align=right | 3.1 km || 
|-id=337 bgcolor=#E9E9E9
| 459337 ||  || — || January 14, 2011 || Mount Lemmon || Mount Lemmon Survey || — || align=right | 2.0 km || 
|-id=338 bgcolor=#d6d6d6
| 459338 ||  || — || January 15, 1996 || Kitt Peak || Spacewatch || — || align=right | 3.1 km || 
|-id=339 bgcolor=#E9E9E9
| 459339 ||  || — || September 26, 2009 || Kitt Peak || Spacewatch || — || align=right | 1.3 km || 
|-id=340 bgcolor=#E9E9E9
| 459340 ||  || — || September 17, 2009 || Kitt Peak || Spacewatch || — || align=right | 2.1 km || 
|-id=341 bgcolor=#E9E9E9
| 459341 ||  || — || February 16, 2007 || Catalina || CSS || — || align=right | 2.2 km || 
|-id=342 bgcolor=#d6d6d6
| 459342 ||  || — || May 11, 2007 || Mount Lemmon || Mount Lemmon Survey || — || align=right | 2.5 km || 
|-id=343 bgcolor=#d6d6d6
| 459343 ||  || — || September 29, 2008 || Catalina || CSS || — || align=right | 3.9 km || 
|-id=344 bgcolor=#d6d6d6
| 459344 ||  || — || April 25, 2012 || Kitt Peak || Spacewatch || EOS || align=right | 1.8 km || 
|-id=345 bgcolor=#E9E9E9
| 459345 ||  || — || January 8, 2011 || Mount Lemmon || Mount Lemmon Survey || — || align=right | 2.2 km || 
|-id=346 bgcolor=#E9E9E9
| 459346 ||  || — || March 29, 2012 || Kitt Peak || Spacewatch || — || align=right | 1.4 km || 
|-id=347 bgcolor=#E9E9E9
| 459347 ||  || — || November 14, 2010 || Mount Lemmon || Mount Lemmon Survey || — || align=right | 1.4 km || 
|-id=348 bgcolor=#E9E9E9
| 459348 ||  || — || November 12, 2010 || Mount Lemmon || Mount Lemmon Survey || — || align=right | 1.4 km || 
|-id=349 bgcolor=#d6d6d6
| 459349 ||  || — || March 31, 2012 || Kitt Peak || Spacewatch || — || align=right | 3.2 km || 
|-id=350 bgcolor=#E9E9E9
| 459350 ||  || — || April 4, 2008 || Kitt Peak || Spacewatch || — || align=right data-sort-value="0.95" | 950 m || 
|-id=351 bgcolor=#E9E9E9
| 459351 ||  || — || June 10, 1999 || Kitt Peak || Spacewatch || MIS || align=right | 2.6 km || 
|-id=352 bgcolor=#d6d6d6
| 459352 ||  || — || March 8, 2011 || Catalina || CSS || — || align=right | 4.0 km || 
|-id=353 bgcolor=#E9E9E9
| 459353 ||  || — || February 24, 2012 || Mount Lemmon || Mount Lemmon Survey || JUN || align=right data-sort-value="0.94" | 940 m || 
|-id=354 bgcolor=#d6d6d6
| 459354 ||  || — || November 9, 2009 || Kitt Peak || Spacewatch || — || align=right | 3.2 km || 
|-id=355 bgcolor=#E9E9E9
| 459355 ||  || — || January 27, 2007 || Mount Lemmon || Mount Lemmon Survey || DOR || align=right | 1.9 km || 
|-id=356 bgcolor=#d6d6d6
| 459356 ||  || — || April 30, 2012 || Mount Lemmon || Mount Lemmon Survey || — || align=right | 2.8 km || 
|-id=357 bgcolor=#d6d6d6
| 459357 ||  || — || August 24, 2008 || Kitt Peak || Spacewatch || — || align=right | 2.7 km || 
|-id=358 bgcolor=#d6d6d6
| 459358 ||  || — || April 30, 2012 || Kitt Peak || Spacewatch || — || align=right | 3.4 km || 
|-id=359 bgcolor=#E9E9E9
| 459359 ||  || — || January 10, 2007 || Kitt Peak || Spacewatch || EUN || align=right data-sort-value="0.88" | 880 m || 
|-id=360 bgcolor=#E9E9E9
| 459360 ||  || — || December 14, 2006 || Mount Lemmon || Mount Lemmon Survey || — || align=right | 1.5 km || 
|-id=361 bgcolor=#d6d6d6
| 459361 ||  || — || April 19, 2012 || Kitt Peak || Spacewatch || EOS || align=right | 2.1 km || 
|-id=362 bgcolor=#E9E9E9
| 459362 ||  || — || March 15, 2008 || Mount Lemmon || Mount Lemmon Survey || — || align=right | 1.2 km || 
|-id=363 bgcolor=#E9E9E9
| 459363 ||  || — || May 25, 2003 || Kitt Peak || Spacewatch || — || align=right | 2.4 km || 
|-id=364 bgcolor=#E9E9E9
| 459364 ||  || — || March 14, 2007 || Mount Lemmon || Mount Lemmon Survey || — || align=right | 1.6 km || 
|-id=365 bgcolor=#d6d6d6
| 459365 ||  || — || May 12, 2012 || Mount Lemmon || Mount Lemmon Survey || EOS || align=right | 2.2 km || 
|-id=366 bgcolor=#E9E9E9
| 459366 ||  || — || November 6, 2010 || Mount Lemmon || Mount Lemmon Survey || — || align=right | 3.0 km || 
|-id=367 bgcolor=#E9E9E9
| 459367 ||  || — || May 1, 2003 || Kitt Peak || Spacewatch || — || align=right | 2.3 km || 
|-id=368 bgcolor=#E9E9E9
| 459368 ||  || — || February 23, 2007 || Mount Lemmon || Mount Lemmon Survey || — || align=right | 1.9 km || 
|-id=369 bgcolor=#E9E9E9
| 459369 ||  || — || March 15, 2012 || Mount Lemmon || Mount Lemmon Survey || — || align=right | 1.4 km || 
|-id=370 bgcolor=#E9E9E9
| 459370 ||  || — || June 12, 2008 || Kitt Peak || Spacewatch || — || align=right | 1.3 km || 
|-id=371 bgcolor=#d6d6d6
| 459371 ||  || — || April 21, 2012 || Mount Lemmon || Mount Lemmon Survey || — || align=right | 2.9 km || 
|-id=372 bgcolor=#E9E9E9
| 459372 ||  || — || May 1, 2012 || Mount Lemmon || Mount Lemmon Survey || — || align=right | 1.7 km || 
|-id=373 bgcolor=#d6d6d6
| 459373 ||  || — || April 15, 2001 || Kitt Peak || Spacewatch || EOS || align=right | 2.1 km || 
|-id=374 bgcolor=#E9E9E9
| 459374 ||  || — || April 17, 2012 || Kitt Peak || Spacewatch || — || align=right | 1.5 km || 
|-id=375 bgcolor=#d6d6d6
| 459375 ||  || — || June 18, 2007 || Kitt Peak || Spacewatch || — || align=right | 4.2 km || 
|-id=376 bgcolor=#d6d6d6
| 459376 ||  || — || May 14, 2012 || Mount Lemmon || Mount Lemmon Survey || — || align=right | 2.7 km || 
|-id=377 bgcolor=#d6d6d6
| 459377 ||  || — || November 19, 2009 || Kitt Peak || Spacewatch || EOS || align=right | 1.8 km || 
|-id=378 bgcolor=#d6d6d6
| 459378 ||  || — || April 21, 2012 || Mount Lemmon || Mount Lemmon Survey || — || align=right | 2.6 km || 
|-id=379 bgcolor=#d6d6d6
| 459379 ||  || — || February 13, 2011 || Mount Lemmon || Mount Lemmon Survey || — || align=right | 2.8 km || 
|-id=380 bgcolor=#d6d6d6
| 459380 ||  || — || April 1, 2012 || Mount Lemmon || Mount Lemmon Survey || TRE || align=right | 2.3 km || 
|-id=381 bgcolor=#E9E9E9
| 459381 ||  || — || May 14, 2012 || Mount Lemmon || Mount Lemmon Survey || — || align=right | 1.7 km || 
|-id=382 bgcolor=#d6d6d6
| 459382 ||  || — || April 30, 2012 || Mount Lemmon || Mount Lemmon Survey || EOS || align=right | 1.7 km || 
|-id=383 bgcolor=#E9E9E9
| 459383 ||  || — || March 13, 2007 || Mount Lemmon || Mount Lemmon Survey || — || align=right | 1.7 km || 
|-id=384 bgcolor=#d6d6d6
| 459384 ||  || — || November 11, 2009 || Mount Lemmon || Mount Lemmon Survey || EOS || align=right | 1.5 km || 
|-id=385 bgcolor=#d6d6d6
| 459385 ||  || — || January 14, 2011 || Mount Lemmon || Mount Lemmon Survey || — || align=right | 2.6 km || 
|-id=386 bgcolor=#FFC2E0
| 459386 ||  || — || May 17, 2012 || Mount Lemmon || Mount Lemmon Survey || APO +1km || align=right | 1.4 km || 
|-id=387 bgcolor=#d6d6d6
| 459387 ||  || — || April 2, 2011 || Mount Lemmon || Mount Lemmon Survey || — || align=right | 3.9 km || 
|-id=388 bgcolor=#d6d6d6
| 459388 ||  || — || May 20, 2012 || Mount Lemmon || Mount Lemmon Survey || EOS || align=right | 2.1 km || 
|-id=389 bgcolor=#E9E9E9
| 459389 ||  || — || April 24, 2003 || Campo Imperatore || CINEOS || — || align=right | 3.2 km || 
|-id=390 bgcolor=#d6d6d6
| 459390 ||  || — || March 28, 2012 || Kitt Peak || Spacewatch || — || align=right | 2.7 km || 
|-id=391 bgcolor=#d6d6d6
| 459391 ||  || — || March 16, 2007 || Mount Lemmon || Mount Lemmon Survey || — || align=right | 2.2 km || 
|-id=392 bgcolor=#d6d6d6
| 459392 ||  || — || September 24, 2008 || Mount Lemmon || Mount Lemmon Survey || 7:4 || align=right | 2.9 km || 
|-id=393 bgcolor=#E9E9E9
| 459393 ||  || — || December 25, 2010 || Kitt Peak || Spacewatch || — || align=right | 1.7 km || 
|-id=394 bgcolor=#E9E9E9
| 459394 ||  || — || October 16, 2009 || Mount Lemmon || Mount Lemmon Survey || — || align=right | 2.0 km || 
|-id=395 bgcolor=#E9E9E9
| 459395 ||  || — || October 7, 2005 || Kitt Peak || Spacewatch || — || align=right | 1.0 km || 
|-id=396 bgcolor=#d6d6d6
| 459396 ||  || — || May 19, 2012 || Mount Lemmon || Mount Lemmon Survey || — || align=right | 2.8 km || 
|-id=397 bgcolor=#d6d6d6
| 459397 ||  || — || March 28, 2012 || Kitt Peak || Spacewatch ||  || align=right | 2.9 km || 
|-id=398 bgcolor=#d6d6d6
| 459398 ||  || — || April 20, 2012 || Mount Lemmon || Mount Lemmon Survey || EOS || align=right | 2.0 km || 
|-id=399 bgcolor=#E9E9E9
| 459399 ||  || — || May 19, 2012 || Mount Lemmon || Mount Lemmon Survey || — || align=right | 2.4 km || 
|-id=400 bgcolor=#E9E9E9
| 459400 ||  || — || April 27, 2012 || Mount Lemmon || Mount Lemmon Survey || — || align=right | 1.2 km || 
|}

459401–459500 

|-bgcolor=#d6d6d6
| 459401 ||  || — || May 31, 2012 || Mount Lemmon || Mount Lemmon Survey || EOS || align=right | 2.1 km || 
|-id=402 bgcolor=#E9E9E9
| 459402 ||  || — || December 25, 2005 || Kitt Peak || Spacewatch || — || align=right | 2.0 km || 
|-id=403 bgcolor=#d6d6d6
| 459403 ||  || — || September 27, 2003 || Kitt Peak || Spacewatch || EOS || align=right | 1.8 km || 
|-id=404 bgcolor=#d6d6d6
| 459404 ||  || — || May 21, 2012 || Mount Lemmon || Mount Lemmon Survey || — || align=right | 3.0 km || 
|-id=405 bgcolor=#d6d6d6
| 459405 ||  || — || November 24, 2009 || Mount Lemmon || Mount Lemmon Survey || — || align=right | 2.7 km || 
|-id=406 bgcolor=#d6d6d6
| 459406 ||  || — || May 18, 2012 || Kitt Peak || Spacewatch || BRA || align=right | 1.4 km || 
|-id=407 bgcolor=#d6d6d6
| 459407 ||  || — || February 13, 2011 || Mount Lemmon || Mount Lemmon Survey || — || align=right | 3.4 km || 
|-id=408 bgcolor=#E9E9E9
| 459408 ||  || — || February 1, 2003 || Kitt Peak || Spacewatch || — || align=right | 1.3 km || 
|-id=409 bgcolor=#d6d6d6
| 459409 ||  || — || February 16, 2010 || WISE || WISE || — || align=right | 3.7 km || 
|-id=410 bgcolor=#d6d6d6
| 459410 ||  || — || February 4, 2005 || Kitt Peak || Spacewatch || — || align=right | 2.9 km || 
|-id=411 bgcolor=#E9E9E9
| 459411 ||  || — || December 4, 2005 || Kitt Peak || Spacewatch || — || align=right | 2.3 km || 
|-id=412 bgcolor=#E9E9E9
| 459412 ||  || — || January 12, 2011 || Mount Lemmon || Mount Lemmon Survey || — || align=right | 2.8 km || 
|-id=413 bgcolor=#d6d6d6
| 459413 ||  || — || April 10, 2010 || WISE || WISE || — || align=right | 2.6 km || 
|-id=414 bgcolor=#fefefe
| 459414 ||  || — || December 29, 2005 || Mount Lemmon || Mount Lemmon Survey || H || align=right data-sort-value="0.63" | 630 m || 
|-id=415 bgcolor=#d6d6d6
| 459415 ||  || — || March 7, 2005 || Socorro || LINEAR || — || align=right | 4.5 km || 
|-id=416 bgcolor=#FA8072
| 459416 ||  || — || January 4, 2006 || Mount Lemmon || Mount Lemmon Survey || H || align=right data-sort-value="0.67" | 670 m || 
|-id=417 bgcolor=#d6d6d6
| 459417 ||  || — || April 4, 2010 || WISE || WISE || — || align=right | 3.8 km || 
|-id=418 bgcolor=#fefefe
| 459418 ||  || — || January 7, 2006 || Mount Lemmon || Mount Lemmon Survey || H || align=right data-sort-value="0.80" | 800 m || 
|-id=419 bgcolor=#d6d6d6
| 459419 ||  || — || October 12, 2007 || Mount Lemmon || Mount Lemmon Survey || EOS || align=right | 2.0 km || 
|-id=420 bgcolor=#fefefe
| 459420 ||  || — || December 31, 2007 || Catalina || CSS || H || align=right data-sort-value="0.55" | 550 m || 
|-id=421 bgcolor=#FA8072
| 459421 ||  || — || January 9, 2006 || Mount Lemmon || Mount Lemmon Survey || H || align=right data-sort-value="0.51" | 510 m || 
|-id=422 bgcolor=#C2FFFF
| 459422 ||  || — || April 1, 2010 || WISE || WISE || L5 || align=right | 12 km || 
|-id=423 bgcolor=#d6d6d6
| 459423 ||  || — || April 24, 2011 || Kitt Peak || Spacewatch || — || align=right | 3.0 km || 
|-id=424 bgcolor=#d6d6d6
| 459424 ||  || — || October 27, 2008 || Kitt Peak || Spacewatch || — || align=right | 3.0 km || 
|-id=425 bgcolor=#FA8072
| 459425 ||  || — || September 3, 2007 || Catalina || CSS || H || align=right data-sort-value="0.51" | 510 m || 
|-id=426 bgcolor=#fefefe
| 459426 ||  || — || October 5, 2004 || Kitt Peak || Spacewatch || H || align=right data-sort-value="0.54" | 540 m || 
|-id=427 bgcolor=#C2FFFF
| 459427 ||  || — || April 11, 2010 || WISE || WISE || L5 || align=right | 9.0 km || 
|-id=428 bgcolor=#C2FFFF
| 459428 ||  || — || April 13, 2010 || WISE || WISE || L5 || align=right | 9.7 km || 
|-id=429 bgcolor=#fefefe
| 459429 ||  || — || August 25, 2012 || Kitt Peak || Spacewatch || H || align=right data-sort-value="0.70" | 700 m || 
|-id=430 bgcolor=#d6d6d6
| 459430 ||  || — || September 26, 2012 || Mount Lemmon || Mount Lemmon Survey || — || align=right | 3.4 km || 
|-id=431 bgcolor=#fefefe
| 459431 ||  || — || December 31, 2002 || Socorro || LINEAR || H || align=right data-sort-value="0.67" | 670 m || 
|-id=432 bgcolor=#C2FFFF
| 459432 ||  || — || August 26, 2012 || Kitt Peak || Spacewatch || L5 || align=right | 7.7 km || 
|-id=433 bgcolor=#d6d6d6
| 459433 ||  || — || March 15, 2010 || Mount Lemmon || Mount Lemmon Survey || — || align=right | 2.9 km || 
|-id=434 bgcolor=#d6d6d6
| 459434 ||  || — || February 9, 2010 || Kitt Peak || Spacewatch || — || align=right | 2.8 km || 
|-id=435 bgcolor=#d6d6d6
| 459435 ||  || — || October 12, 2005 || Kitt Peak || Spacewatch || 3:2 || align=right | 3.9 km || 
|-id=436 bgcolor=#C2FFFF
| 459436 ||  || — || August 24, 2012 || Kitt Peak || Spacewatch || L5 || align=right | 7.2 km || 
|-id=437 bgcolor=#d6d6d6
| 459437 ||  || — || April 11, 2005 || Mount Lemmon || Mount Lemmon Survey || — || align=right | 3.0 km || 
|-id=438 bgcolor=#C2FFFF
| 459438 ||  || — || September 19, 2011 || Mount Lemmon || Mount Lemmon Survey || L5 || align=right | 7.4 km || 
|-id=439 bgcolor=#C2FFFF
| 459439 ||  || — || March 9, 2007 || Mount Lemmon || Mount Lemmon Survey || L5 || align=right | 9.3 km || 
|-id=440 bgcolor=#fefefe
| 459440 ||  || — || October 15, 2012 || Kitt Peak || Spacewatch || H || align=right data-sort-value="0.62" | 620 m || 
|-id=441 bgcolor=#fefefe
| 459441 ||  || — || May 21, 2006 || Mount Lemmon || Mount Lemmon Survey || H || align=right data-sort-value="0.79" | 790 m || 
|-id=442 bgcolor=#fefefe
| 459442 ||  || — || October 17, 2012 || Mount Lemmon || Mount Lemmon Survey || H || align=right data-sort-value="0.62" | 620 m || 
|-id=443 bgcolor=#d6d6d6
| 459443 ||  || — || September 16, 2006 || Catalina || CSS || — || align=right | 2.9 km || 
|-id=444 bgcolor=#fefefe
| 459444 ||  || — || March 31, 2011 || Siding Spring || SSS || H || align=right data-sort-value="0.82" | 820 m || 
|-id=445 bgcolor=#d6d6d6
| 459445 ||  || — || November 21, 2001 || Socorro || LINEAR || Tj (2.99) || align=right | 4.8 km || 
|-id=446 bgcolor=#fefefe
| 459446 ||  || — || November 2, 2007 || Catalina || CSS || H || align=right data-sort-value="0.69" | 690 m || 
|-id=447 bgcolor=#fefefe
| 459447 ||  || — || December 3, 2007 || Kitt Peak || Spacewatch || H || align=right data-sort-value="0.74" | 740 m || 
|-id=448 bgcolor=#fefefe
| 459448 ||  || — || December 30, 2007 || Kitt Peak || Spacewatch || H || align=right data-sort-value="0.64" | 640 m || 
|-id=449 bgcolor=#fefefe
| 459449 ||  || — || September 14, 1998 || Socorro || LINEAR || H || align=right data-sort-value="0.56" | 560 m || 
|-id=450 bgcolor=#fefefe
| 459450 ||  || — || December 13, 2006 || Mount Lemmon || Mount Lemmon Survey || — || align=right data-sort-value="0.47" | 470 m || 
|-id=451 bgcolor=#FFC2E0
| 459451 ||  || — || November 24, 2012 || Haleakala || Pan-STARRS || APO +1km || align=right | 1.1 km || 
|-id=452 bgcolor=#d6d6d6
| 459452 ||  || — || October 1, 2000 || Anderson Mesa || LONEOS || — || align=right | 3.1 km || 
|-id=453 bgcolor=#fefefe
| 459453 ||  || — || October 30, 2009 || Mount Lemmon || Mount Lemmon Survey || — || align=right data-sort-value="0.79" | 790 m || 
|-id=454 bgcolor=#fefefe
| 459454 ||  || — || May 29, 2003 || Kitt Peak || Spacewatch || H || align=right data-sort-value="0.78" | 780 m || 
|-id=455 bgcolor=#fefefe
| 459455 ||  || — || January 7, 2005 || Socorro || LINEAR || H || align=right data-sort-value="0.72" | 720 m || 
|-id=456 bgcolor=#fefefe
| 459456 ||  || — || December 18, 2007 || Mount Lemmon || Mount Lemmon Survey || H || align=right data-sort-value="0.79" | 790 m || 
|-id=457 bgcolor=#fefefe
| 459457 ||  || — || December 6, 2007 || Mount Lemmon || Mount Lemmon Survey || H || align=right data-sort-value="0.91" | 910 m || 
|-id=458 bgcolor=#FFC2E0
| 459458 ||  || — || December 10, 2012 || Haleakala || Pan-STARRS || APO || align=right data-sort-value="0.69" | 690 m || 
|-id=459 bgcolor=#fefefe
| 459459 ||  || — || December 10, 2012 || Catalina || CSS || H || align=right data-sort-value="0.79" | 790 m || 
|-id=460 bgcolor=#fefefe
| 459460 ||  || — || September 15, 2009 || Catalina || CSS || H || align=right data-sort-value="0.55" | 550 m || 
|-id=461 bgcolor=#fefefe
| 459461 ||  || — || October 4, 2003 || Kitt Peak || Spacewatch || — || align=right data-sort-value="0.82" | 820 m || 
|-id=462 bgcolor=#FFC2E0
| 459462 ||  || — || January 6, 2013 || Catalina || CSS || APO || align=right data-sort-value="0.36" | 360 m || 
|-id=463 bgcolor=#fefefe
| 459463 ||  || — || February 8, 2002 || Kitt Peak || Spacewatch || H || align=right data-sort-value="0.71" | 710 m || 
|-id=464 bgcolor=#fefefe
| 459464 ||  || — || January 9, 2005 || Catalina || CSS || H || align=right data-sort-value="0.54" | 540 m || 
|-id=465 bgcolor=#fefefe
| 459465 ||  || — || August 28, 2005 || Kitt Peak || Spacewatch || — || align=right data-sort-value="0.56" | 560 m || 
|-id=466 bgcolor=#C2FFFF
| 459466 ||  || — || November 6, 2010 || Mount Lemmon || Mount Lemmon Survey || L4 || align=right | 8.0 km || 
|-id=467 bgcolor=#fefefe
| 459467 ||  || — || January 5, 2013 || Mount Lemmon || Mount Lemmon Survey || H || align=right data-sort-value="0.81" | 810 m || 
|-id=468 bgcolor=#fefefe
| 459468 ||  || — || January 6, 2013 || Kitt Peak || Spacewatch || NYS || align=right data-sort-value="0.78" | 780 m || 
|-id=469 bgcolor=#fefefe
| 459469 ||  || — || January 19, 2013 || Mount Lemmon || Mount Lemmon Survey || — || align=right data-sort-value="0.67" | 670 m || 
|-id=470 bgcolor=#fefefe
| 459470 ||  || — || March 31, 2008 || Catalina || CSS || H || align=right data-sort-value="0.73" | 730 m || 
|-id=471 bgcolor=#fefefe
| 459471 ||  || — || March 9, 2007 || Kitt Peak || Spacewatch || — || align=right data-sort-value="0.47" | 470 m || 
|-id=472 bgcolor=#fefefe
| 459472 ||  || — || November 25, 2005 || Kitt Peak || Spacewatch || — || align=right data-sort-value="0.61" | 610 m || 
|-id=473 bgcolor=#fefefe
| 459473 ||  || — || January 17, 2013 || Mount Lemmon || Mount Lemmon Survey || — || align=right data-sort-value="0.77" | 770 m || 
|-id=474 bgcolor=#fefefe
| 459474 ||  || — || April 14, 2010 || Kitt Peak || Spacewatch || V || align=right data-sort-value="0.71" | 710 m || 
|-id=475 bgcolor=#fefefe
| 459475 ||  || — || December 4, 2008 || Kitt Peak || Spacewatch || V || align=right data-sort-value="0.69" | 690 m || 
|-id=476 bgcolor=#FA8072
| 459476 ||  || — || September 22, 2004 || Anderson Mesa || LONEOS || H || align=right data-sort-value="0.80" | 800 m || 
|-id=477 bgcolor=#fefefe
| 459477 ||  || — || September 25, 2008 || Kitt Peak || Spacewatch || — || align=right data-sort-value="0.54" | 540 m || 
|-id=478 bgcolor=#fefefe
| 459478 ||  || — || February 5, 2013 || Kitt Peak || Spacewatch || H || align=right data-sort-value="0.69" | 690 m || 
|-id=479 bgcolor=#fefefe
| 459479 ||  || — || February 5, 2013 || Kitt Peak || Spacewatch || — || align=right data-sort-value="0.75" | 750 m || 
|-id=480 bgcolor=#fefefe
| 459480 ||  || — || June 9, 2007 || Kitt Peak || Spacewatch || — || align=right data-sort-value="0.57" | 570 m || 
|-id=481 bgcolor=#E9E9E9
| 459481 ||  || — || January 19, 2013 || Kitt Peak || Spacewatch || — || align=right | 1.2 km || 
|-id=482 bgcolor=#fefefe
| 459482 ||  || — || January 4, 2006 || Mount Lemmon || Mount Lemmon Survey || — || align=right data-sort-value="0.46" | 460 m || 
|-id=483 bgcolor=#fefefe
| 459483 ||  || — || October 1, 2005 || Kitt Peak || Spacewatch || — || align=right data-sort-value="0.56" | 560 m || 
|-id=484 bgcolor=#E9E9E9
| 459484 ||  || — || February 10, 2008 || Mount Lemmon || Mount Lemmon Survey || — || align=right | 2.6 km || 
|-id=485 bgcolor=#fefefe
| 459485 ||  || — || April 15, 2007 || Kitt Peak || Spacewatch || — || align=right data-sort-value="0.60" | 600 m || 
|-id=486 bgcolor=#fefefe
| 459486 ||  || — || June 17, 2010 || Mount Lemmon || Mount Lemmon Survey || — || align=right | 1.1 km || 
|-id=487 bgcolor=#fefefe
| 459487 ||  || — || May 9, 2007 || Kitt Peak || Spacewatch || — || align=right data-sort-value="0.57" | 570 m || 
|-id=488 bgcolor=#fefefe
| 459488 ||  || — || October 26, 2005 || Kitt Peak || Spacewatch || — || align=right data-sort-value="0.66" | 660 m || 
|-id=489 bgcolor=#fefefe
| 459489 ||  || — || May 9, 2010 || Siding Spring || SSS || — || align=right data-sort-value="0.61" | 610 m || 
|-id=490 bgcolor=#fefefe
| 459490 ||  || — || April 8, 2006 || Kitt Peak || Spacewatch || MAS || align=right data-sort-value="0.60" | 600 m || 
|-id=491 bgcolor=#FA8072
| 459491 ||  || — || January 19, 2004 || Kitt Peak || Spacewatch || — || align=right data-sort-value="0.50" | 500 m || 
|-id=492 bgcolor=#fefefe
| 459492 ||  || — || January 9, 2013 || Mount Lemmon || Mount Lemmon Survey || — || align=right data-sort-value="0.73" | 730 m || 
|-id=493 bgcolor=#fefefe
| 459493 ||  || — || February 24, 2006 || Kitt Peak || Spacewatch || — || align=right data-sort-value="0.60" | 600 m || 
|-id=494 bgcolor=#fefefe
| 459494 ||  || — || September 28, 2011 || Mount Lemmon || Mount Lemmon Survey || — || align=right data-sort-value="0.70" | 700 m || 
|-id=495 bgcolor=#fefefe
| 459495 ||  || — || December 21, 2005 || Kitt Peak || Spacewatch || — || align=right data-sort-value="0.73" | 730 m || 
|-id=496 bgcolor=#fefefe
| 459496 ||  || — || February 7, 2013 || Kitt Peak || Spacewatch || — || align=right data-sort-value="0.79" | 790 m || 
|-id=497 bgcolor=#fefefe
| 459497 ||  || — || May 11, 2010 || Mount Lemmon || Mount Lemmon Survey || — || align=right data-sort-value="0.56" | 560 m || 
|-id=498 bgcolor=#fefefe
| 459498 ||  || — || February 4, 2006 || Mount Lemmon || Mount Lemmon Survey || — || align=right data-sort-value="0.72" | 720 m || 
|-id=499 bgcolor=#fefefe
| 459499 ||  || — || April 15, 1997 || Kitt Peak || Spacewatch || — || align=right data-sort-value="0.55" | 550 m || 
|-id=500 bgcolor=#fefefe
| 459500 ||  || — || March 18, 2010 || Mount Lemmon || Mount Lemmon Survey || — || align=right data-sort-value="0.55" | 550 m || 
|}

459501–459600 

|-bgcolor=#fefefe
| 459501 ||  || — || October 29, 2005 || Catalina || CSS || — || align=right data-sort-value="0.61" | 610 m || 
|-id=502 bgcolor=#fefefe
| 459502 ||  || — || September 4, 2008 || Kitt Peak || Spacewatch || — || align=right data-sort-value="0.54" | 540 m || 
|-id=503 bgcolor=#fefefe
| 459503 ||  || — || December 1, 2008 || Mount Lemmon || Mount Lemmon Survey || — || align=right data-sort-value="0.76" | 760 m || 
|-id=504 bgcolor=#fefefe
| 459504 ||  || — || September 21, 2011 || Kitt Peak || Spacewatch || — || align=right data-sort-value="0.70" | 700 m || 
|-id=505 bgcolor=#fefefe
| 459505 ||  || — || March 3, 2013 || Mount Lemmon || Mount Lemmon Survey || (2076) || align=right data-sort-value="0.82" | 820 m || 
|-id=506 bgcolor=#fefefe
| 459506 ||  || — || October 5, 2004 || Kitt Peak || Spacewatch || — || align=right data-sort-value="0.85" | 850 m || 
|-id=507 bgcolor=#fefefe
| 459507 ||  || — || May 26, 2003 || Kitt Peak || Spacewatch || V || align=right data-sort-value="0.76" | 760 m || 
|-id=508 bgcolor=#fefefe
| 459508 ||  || — || November 24, 2008 || Kitt Peak || Spacewatch || — || align=right data-sort-value="0.91" | 910 m || 
|-id=509 bgcolor=#fefefe
| 459509 ||  || — || February 22, 2006 || Catalina || CSS || — || align=right data-sort-value="0.69" | 690 m || 
|-id=510 bgcolor=#fefefe
| 459510 ||  || — || November 29, 2005 || Kitt Peak || Spacewatch || — || align=right data-sort-value="0.62" | 620 m || 
|-id=511 bgcolor=#fefefe
| 459511 ||  || — || January 31, 1995 || Kitt Peak || Spacewatch || — || align=right data-sort-value="0.56" | 560 m || 
|-id=512 bgcolor=#fefefe
| 459512 ||  || — || January 5, 2006 || Kitt Peak || Spacewatch || — || align=right data-sort-value="0.48" | 480 m || 
|-id=513 bgcolor=#fefefe
| 459513 ||  || — || September 11, 2007 || Mount Lemmon || Mount Lemmon Survey || — || align=right data-sort-value="0.71" | 710 m || 
|-id=514 bgcolor=#fefefe
| 459514 ||  || — || May 19, 2010 || Mount Lemmon || Mount Lemmon Survey || — || align=right data-sort-value="0.77" | 770 m || 
|-id=515 bgcolor=#fefefe
| 459515 ||  || — || February 5, 2013 || Kitt Peak || Spacewatch || — || align=right data-sort-value="0.58" | 580 m || 
|-id=516 bgcolor=#fefefe
| 459516 ||  || — || November 2, 2011 || Mount Lemmon || Mount Lemmon Survey || — || align=right data-sort-value="0.68" | 680 m || 
|-id=517 bgcolor=#fefefe
| 459517 ||  || — || February 3, 2009 || Kitt Peak || Spacewatch || — || align=right data-sort-value="0.71" | 710 m || 
|-id=518 bgcolor=#fefefe
| 459518 ||  || — || September 22, 2008 || Kitt Peak || Spacewatch || — || align=right data-sort-value="0.64" | 640 m || 
|-id=519 bgcolor=#fefefe
| 459519 ||  || — || February 17, 2013 || Kitt Peak || Spacewatch || — || align=right | 1.0 km || 
|-id=520 bgcolor=#E9E9E9
| 459520 ||  || — || March 11, 2013 || Kitt Peak || Spacewatch || — || align=right | 1.3 km || 
|-id=521 bgcolor=#fefefe
| 459521 ||  || — || July 9, 2003 || Kitt Peak || Spacewatch || — || align=right | 1.0 km || 
|-id=522 bgcolor=#fefefe
| 459522 ||  || — || October 15, 2007 || Mount Lemmon || Mount Lemmon Survey || — || align=right data-sort-value="0.96" | 960 m || 
|-id=523 bgcolor=#E9E9E9
| 459523 ||  || — || May 1, 2009 || Kitt Peak || Spacewatch || — || align=right | 1.8 km || 
|-id=524 bgcolor=#fefefe
| 459524 ||  || — || October 24, 2011 || Mount Lemmon || Mount Lemmon Survey || — || align=right data-sort-value="0.58" | 580 m || 
|-id=525 bgcolor=#fefefe
| 459525 ||  || — || December 21, 2008 || Kitt Peak || Spacewatch || — || align=right data-sort-value="0.68" | 680 m || 
|-id=526 bgcolor=#fefefe
| 459526 ||  || — || December 3, 2008 || Mount Lemmon || Mount Lemmon Survey || — || align=right data-sort-value="0.68" | 680 m || 
|-id=527 bgcolor=#d6d6d6
| 459527 ||  || — || March 12, 2013 || Siding Spring || SSS || — || align=right | 5.3 km || 
|-id=528 bgcolor=#fefefe
| 459528 ||  || — || October 23, 2008 || Mount Lemmon || Mount Lemmon Survey || — || align=right data-sort-value="0.65" | 650 m || 
|-id=529 bgcolor=#fefefe
| 459529 ||  || — || March 17, 2009 || Kitt Peak || Spacewatch || — || align=right data-sort-value="0.66" | 660 m || 
|-id=530 bgcolor=#fefefe
| 459530 ||  || — || November 2, 2008 || Mount Lemmon || Mount Lemmon Survey || — || align=right data-sort-value="0.59" | 590 m || 
|-id=531 bgcolor=#fefefe
| 459531 ||  || — || February 17, 2013 || Kitt Peak || Spacewatch || — || align=right data-sort-value="0.89" | 890 m || 
|-id=532 bgcolor=#fefefe
| 459532 ||  || — || November 8, 2008 || Kitt Peak || Spacewatch || — || align=right data-sort-value="0.67" | 670 m || 
|-id=533 bgcolor=#fefefe
| 459533 ||  || — || February 24, 2006 || Kitt Peak || Spacewatch || — || align=right data-sort-value="0.68" | 680 m || 
|-id=534 bgcolor=#fefefe
| 459534 ||  || — || February 14, 2013 || Mount Lemmon || Mount Lemmon Survey || — || align=right data-sort-value="0.94" | 940 m || 
|-id=535 bgcolor=#fefefe
| 459535 ||  || — || February 27, 2006 || Kitt Peak || Spacewatch || — || align=right data-sort-value="0.57" | 570 m || 
|-id=536 bgcolor=#fefefe
| 459536 ||  || — || December 28, 2005 || Kitt Peak || Spacewatch || — || align=right data-sort-value="0.48" | 480 m || 
|-id=537 bgcolor=#fefefe
| 459537 ||  || — || April 25, 2006 || Kitt Peak || Spacewatch || — || align=right data-sort-value="0.86" | 860 m || 
|-id=538 bgcolor=#fefefe
| 459538 ||  || — || September 28, 2011 || Kitt Peak || Spacewatch || — || align=right data-sort-value="0.59" | 590 m || 
|-id=539 bgcolor=#fefefe
| 459539 ||  || — || October 15, 2007 || Mount Lemmon || Mount Lemmon Survey || — || align=right data-sort-value="0.74" | 740 m || 
|-id=540 bgcolor=#fefefe
| 459540 ||  || — || April 21, 2006 || Kitt Peak || Spacewatch || — || align=right data-sort-value="0.64" | 640 m || 
|-id=541 bgcolor=#fefefe
| 459541 ||  || — || March 13, 2013 || Mount Lemmon || Mount Lemmon Survey || — || align=right data-sort-value="0.66" | 660 m || 
|-id=542 bgcolor=#fefefe
| 459542 ||  || — || April 25, 2006 || Mount Lemmon || Mount Lemmon Survey || — || align=right data-sort-value="0.65" | 650 m || 
|-id=543 bgcolor=#E9E9E9
| 459543 ||  || — || April 2, 2013 || Mount Lemmon || Mount Lemmon Survey || — || align=right data-sort-value="0.94" | 940 m || 
|-id=544 bgcolor=#fefefe
| 459544 ||  || — || October 27, 2008 || Kitt Peak || Spacewatch || — || align=right data-sort-value="0.71" | 710 m || 
|-id=545 bgcolor=#fefefe
| 459545 ||  || — || November 28, 2011 || Mount Lemmon || Mount Lemmon Survey || — || align=right data-sort-value="0.73" | 730 m || 
|-id=546 bgcolor=#fefefe
| 459546 ||  || — || February 25, 2006 || Kitt Peak || Spacewatch || — || align=right data-sort-value="0.59" | 590 m || 
|-id=547 bgcolor=#E9E9E9
| 459547 ||  || — || March 31, 2013 || Mount Lemmon || Mount Lemmon Survey || — || align=right data-sort-value="0.81" | 810 m || 
|-id=548 bgcolor=#fefefe
| 459548 ||  || — || March 12, 2013 || Kitt Peak || Spacewatch || — || align=right data-sort-value="0.71" | 710 m || 
|-id=549 bgcolor=#fefefe
| 459549 ||  || — || April 9, 2002 || Anderson Mesa || LONEOS || NYS || align=right data-sort-value="0.72" | 720 m || 
|-id=550 bgcolor=#fefefe
| 459550 ||  || — || March 26, 2006 || Mount Lemmon || Mount Lemmon Survey || NYS || align=right data-sort-value="0.55" | 550 m || 
|-id=551 bgcolor=#fefefe
| 459551 ||  || — || September 23, 2004 || Kitt Peak || Spacewatch || — || align=right data-sort-value="0.64" | 640 m || 
|-id=552 bgcolor=#fefefe
| 459552 ||  || — || August 4, 2010 || WISE || WISE || — || align=right | 1.6 km || 
|-id=553 bgcolor=#fefefe
| 459553 ||  || — || January 7, 2006 || Mount Lemmon || Mount Lemmon Survey || — || align=right data-sort-value="0.53" | 530 m || 
|-id=554 bgcolor=#fefefe
| 459554 ||  || — || May 23, 2006 || Kitt Peak || Spacewatch || — || align=right data-sort-value="0.69" | 690 m || 
|-id=555 bgcolor=#fefefe
| 459555 ||  || — || March 4, 2005 || Mount Lemmon || Mount Lemmon Survey || — || align=right data-sort-value="0.76" | 760 m || 
|-id=556 bgcolor=#fefefe
| 459556 ||  || — || November 3, 2007 || Mount Lemmon || Mount Lemmon Survey || — || align=right data-sort-value="0.65" | 650 m || 
|-id=557 bgcolor=#fefefe
| 459557 ||  || — || March 3, 2006 || Mount Lemmon || Mount Lemmon Survey || — || align=right data-sort-value="0.57" | 570 m || 
|-id=558 bgcolor=#d6d6d6
| 459558 ||  || — || April 13, 2013 || Mount Lemmon || Mount Lemmon Survey || EOS || align=right | 2.1 km || 
|-id=559 bgcolor=#E9E9E9
| 459559 ||  || — || March 7, 2013 || Catalina || CSS || — || align=right | 1.4 km || 
|-id=560 bgcolor=#fefefe
| 459560 ||  || — || April 12, 2010 || Kitt Peak || Spacewatch || — || align=right data-sort-value="0.62" | 620 m || 
|-id=561 bgcolor=#FA8072
| 459561 ||  || — || September 5, 2010 || Mount Lemmon || Mount Lemmon Survey || — || align=right data-sort-value="0.66" | 660 m || 
|-id=562 bgcolor=#fefefe
| 459562 ||  || — || May 24, 2006 || Mount Lemmon || Mount Lemmon Survey || NYS || align=right data-sort-value="0.83" | 830 m || 
|-id=563 bgcolor=#fefefe
| 459563 ||  || — || November 11, 2001 || Kitt Peak || Spacewatch || — || align=right data-sort-value="0.88" | 880 m || 
|-id=564 bgcolor=#fefefe
| 459564 ||  || — || March 31, 2009 || Mount Lemmon || Mount Lemmon Survey || NYS || align=right data-sort-value="0.58" | 580 m || 
|-id=565 bgcolor=#d6d6d6
| 459565 ||  || — || March 20, 2007 || Catalina || CSS || — || align=right | 4.8 km || 
|-id=566 bgcolor=#d6d6d6
| 459566 ||  || — || April 7, 2013 || Kitt Peak || Spacewatch || — || align=right | 3.4 km || 
|-id=567 bgcolor=#fefefe
| 459567 ||  || — || March 16, 2013 || Mount Lemmon || Mount Lemmon Survey || — || align=right data-sort-value="0.70" | 700 m || 
|-id=568 bgcolor=#fefefe
| 459568 ||  || — || January 25, 2006 || Kitt Peak || Spacewatch || — || align=right data-sort-value="0.55" | 550 m || 
|-id=569 bgcolor=#fefefe
| 459569 ||  || — || March 2, 2006 || Kitt Peak || Spacewatch || — || align=right data-sort-value="0.64" | 640 m || 
|-id=570 bgcolor=#fefefe
| 459570 ||  || — || March 26, 2006 || Kitt Peak || Spacewatch || — || align=right data-sort-value="0.68" | 680 m || 
|-id=571 bgcolor=#fefefe
| 459571 ||  || — || October 24, 2011 || Mount Lemmon || Mount Lemmon Survey || — || align=right data-sort-value="0.66" | 660 m || 
|-id=572 bgcolor=#fefefe
| 459572 ||  || — || September 15, 2007 || Kitt Peak || Spacewatch || — || align=right data-sort-value="0.67" | 670 m || 
|-id=573 bgcolor=#d6d6d6
| 459573 ||  || — || April 7, 2013 || Kitt Peak || Spacewatch || — || align=right | 3.2 km || 
|-id=574 bgcolor=#fefefe
| 459574 ||  || — || October 21, 2011 || Kitt Peak || Spacewatch || — || align=right data-sort-value="0.78" | 780 m || 
|-id=575 bgcolor=#fefefe
| 459575 ||  || — || February 1, 2009 || Mount Lemmon || Mount Lemmon Survey || — || align=right data-sort-value="0.74" | 740 m || 
|-id=576 bgcolor=#fefefe
| 459576 ||  || — || February 2, 2006 || Mount Lemmon || Mount Lemmon Survey || — || align=right data-sort-value="0.58" | 580 m || 
|-id=577 bgcolor=#fefefe
| 459577 ||  || — || March 18, 2013 || Kitt Peak || Spacewatch || — || align=right data-sort-value="0.72" | 720 m || 
|-id=578 bgcolor=#fefefe
| 459578 ||  || — || April 8, 2006 || Kitt Peak || Spacewatch || — || align=right data-sort-value="0.68" | 680 m || 
|-id=579 bgcolor=#fefefe
| 459579 ||  || — || January 15, 2005 || Kitt Peak || Spacewatch || — || align=right data-sort-value="0.80" | 800 m || 
|-id=580 bgcolor=#E9E9E9
| 459580 ||  || — || May 16, 2009 || Mount Lemmon || Mount Lemmon Survey || — || align=right | 1.0 km || 
|-id=581 bgcolor=#fefefe
| 459581 ||  || — || October 11, 2007 || Mount Lemmon || Mount Lemmon Survey || — || align=right data-sort-value="0.62" | 620 m || 
|-id=582 bgcolor=#fefefe
| 459582 ||  || — || October 20, 2011 || Mount Lemmon || Mount Lemmon Survey || V || align=right data-sort-value="0.46" | 460 m || 
|-id=583 bgcolor=#d6d6d6
| 459583 ||  || — || November 22, 2009 || Mount Lemmon || Mount Lemmon Survey || — || align=right | 3.2 km || 
|-id=584 bgcolor=#fefefe
| 459584 ||  || — || February 4, 2009 || Mount Lemmon || Mount Lemmon Survey || MAS || align=right data-sort-value="0.63" | 630 m || 
|-id=585 bgcolor=#fefefe
| 459585 ||  || — || March 25, 2006 || Mount Lemmon || Mount Lemmon Survey || — || align=right data-sort-value="0.51" | 510 m || 
|-id=586 bgcolor=#E9E9E9
| 459586 ||  || — || May 1, 2009 || Mount Lemmon || Mount Lemmon Survey || — || align=right | 1.8 km || 
|-id=587 bgcolor=#fefefe
| 459587 ||  || — || April 13, 2013 || Mount Lemmon || Mount Lemmon Survey || — || align=right data-sort-value="0.77" | 770 m || 
|-id=588 bgcolor=#fefefe
| 459588 ||  || — || March 2, 2006 || Kitt Peak || Spacewatch || — || align=right data-sort-value="0.70" | 700 m || 
|-id=589 bgcolor=#E9E9E9
| 459589 ||  || — || September 11, 2010 || Kitt Peak || Spacewatch || — || align=right data-sort-value="0.94" | 940 m || 
|-id=590 bgcolor=#fefefe
| 459590 ||  || — || March 16, 2013 || Mount Lemmon || Mount Lemmon Survey || — || align=right data-sort-value="0.79" | 790 m || 
|-id=591 bgcolor=#fefefe
| 459591 ||  || — || March 23, 2003 || Kitt Peak || Spacewatch || — || align=right data-sort-value="0.51" | 510 m || 
|-id=592 bgcolor=#E9E9E9
| 459592 ||  || — || April 12, 2013 || Mount Lemmon || Mount Lemmon Survey || EUN || align=right | 1.3 km || 
|-id=593 bgcolor=#fefefe
| 459593 ||  || — || December 4, 2008 || Kitt Peak || Spacewatch || — || align=right data-sort-value="0.81" | 810 m || 
|-id=594 bgcolor=#E9E9E9
| 459594 ||  || — || May 20, 2005 || Mount Lemmon || Mount Lemmon Survey || KON || align=right | 2.1 km || 
|-id=595 bgcolor=#E9E9E9
| 459595 ||  || — || July 25, 2010 || WISE || WISE || ADE || align=right | 2.0 km || 
|-id=596 bgcolor=#fefefe
| 459596 ||  || — || May 5, 2006 || Anderson Mesa || LONEOS || — || align=right data-sort-value="0.72" | 720 m || 
|-id=597 bgcolor=#E9E9E9
| 459597 ||  || — || March 7, 2013 || Catalina || CSS || — || align=right | 1.2 km || 
|-id=598 bgcolor=#fefefe
| 459598 ||  || — || March 1, 2009 || Kitt Peak || Spacewatch || — || align=right data-sort-value="0.73" | 730 m || 
|-id=599 bgcolor=#fefefe
| 459599 ||  || — || September 14, 2010 || Mount Lemmon || Mount Lemmon Survey || — || align=right data-sort-value="0.75" | 750 m || 
|-id=600 bgcolor=#fefefe
| 459600 ||  || — || April 19, 2006 || Catalina || CSS || — || align=right data-sort-value="0.74" | 740 m || 
|}

459601–459700 

|-bgcolor=#fefefe
| 459601 ||  || — || February 1, 2009 || Kitt Peak || Spacewatch || — || align=right data-sort-value="0.66" | 660 m || 
|-id=602 bgcolor=#fefefe
| 459602 ||  || — || November 30, 2011 || Kitt Peak || Spacewatch || V || align=right data-sort-value="0.62" | 620 m || 
|-id=603 bgcolor=#fefefe
| 459603 ||  || — || January 30, 2006 || Kitt Peak || Spacewatch || — || align=right data-sort-value="0.68" | 680 m || 
|-id=604 bgcolor=#fefefe
| 459604 ||  || — || January 17, 2009 || Kitt Peak || Spacewatch || — || align=right data-sort-value="0.88" | 880 m || 
|-id=605 bgcolor=#E9E9E9
| 459605 ||  || — || January 2, 2012 || Mount Lemmon || Mount Lemmon Survey || — || align=right | 1.3 km || 
|-id=606 bgcolor=#fefefe
| 459606 ||  || — || December 19, 2004 || Mount Lemmon || Mount Lemmon Survey || V || align=right data-sort-value="0.50" | 500 m || 
|-id=607 bgcolor=#fefefe
| 459607 ||  || — || October 14, 2007 || Mount Lemmon || Mount Lemmon Survey || — || align=right data-sort-value="0.77" | 770 m || 
|-id=608 bgcolor=#fefefe
| 459608 ||  || — || January 31, 2006 || Kitt Peak || Spacewatch || — || align=right data-sort-value="0.50" | 500 m || 
|-id=609 bgcolor=#fefefe
| 459609 ||  || — || September 10, 2007 || Mount Lemmon || Mount Lemmon Survey || — || align=right data-sort-value="0.60" | 600 m || 
|-id=610 bgcolor=#fefefe
| 459610 ||  || — || February 1, 2009 || Kitt Peak || Spacewatch || — || align=right data-sort-value="0.67" | 670 m || 
|-id=611 bgcolor=#fefefe
| 459611 ||  || — || September 11, 2007 || Kitt Peak || Spacewatch || — || align=right data-sort-value="0.60" | 600 m || 
|-id=612 bgcolor=#fefefe
| 459612 ||  || — || October 27, 2003 || Kitt Peak || Spacewatch || — || align=right data-sort-value="0.70" | 700 m || 
|-id=613 bgcolor=#fefefe
| 459613 ||  || — || May 5, 2006 || Kitt Peak || Spacewatch || — || align=right data-sort-value="0.56" | 560 m || 
|-id=614 bgcolor=#fefefe
| 459614 ||  || — || October 30, 2007 || Mount Lemmon || Mount Lemmon Survey || — || align=right data-sort-value="0.62" | 620 m || 
|-id=615 bgcolor=#fefefe
| 459615 ||  || — || September 11, 2007 || Mount Lemmon || Mount Lemmon Survey || NYS || align=right data-sort-value="0.52" | 520 m || 
|-id=616 bgcolor=#E9E9E9
| 459616 ||  || — || October 23, 2006 || Kitt Peak || Spacewatch || — || align=right | 1.8 km || 
|-id=617 bgcolor=#E9E9E9
| 459617 ||  || — || August 30, 2005 || Kitt Peak || Spacewatch || AGN || align=right data-sort-value="0.96" | 960 m || 
|-id=618 bgcolor=#fefefe
| 459618 ||  || — || October 7, 2007 || Mount Lemmon || Mount Lemmon Survey || — || align=right data-sort-value="0.57" | 570 m || 
|-id=619 bgcolor=#fefefe
| 459619 ||  || — || September 9, 2007 || Mount Lemmon || Mount Lemmon Survey || — || align=right data-sort-value="0.72" | 720 m || 
|-id=620 bgcolor=#fefefe
| 459620 ||  || — || January 5, 2006 || Mount Lemmon || Mount Lemmon Survey || — || align=right data-sort-value="0.76" | 760 m || 
|-id=621 bgcolor=#fefefe
| 459621 ||  || — || August 24, 2007 || Kitt Peak || Spacewatch || — || align=right data-sort-value="0.63" | 630 m || 
|-id=622 bgcolor=#fefefe
| 459622 ||  || — || September 10, 2007 || Catalina || CSS || NYS || align=right data-sort-value="0.59" | 590 m || 
|-id=623 bgcolor=#d6d6d6
| 459623 ||  || — || September 16, 2009 || Catalina || CSS || Tj (2.99) || align=right | 7.2 km || 
|-id=624 bgcolor=#fefefe
| 459624 ||  || — || December 22, 2008 || Kitt Peak || Spacewatch || — || align=right data-sort-value="0.68" | 680 m || 
|-id=625 bgcolor=#fefefe
| 459625 ||  || — || March 9, 2006 || Kitt Peak || Spacewatch || — || align=right data-sort-value="0.66" | 660 m || 
|-id=626 bgcolor=#fefefe
| 459626 ||  || — || March 26, 2009 || Mount Lemmon || Mount Lemmon Survey || NYS || align=right data-sort-value="0.61" | 610 m || 
|-id=627 bgcolor=#fefefe
| 459627 ||  || — || March 24, 2006 || Mount Lemmon || Mount Lemmon Survey || — || align=right data-sort-value="0.72" | 720 m || 
|-id=628 bgcolor=#fefefe
| 459628 ||  || — || March 15, 2002 || Kitt Peak || Spacewatch || — || align=right data-sort-value="0.79" | 790 m || 
|-id=629 bgcolor=#E9E9E9
| 459629 ||  || — || January 11, 2008 || Mount Lemmon || Mount Lemmon Survey || — || align=right | 1.6 km || 
|-id=630 bgcolor=#fefefe
| 459630 ||  || — || April 19, 2006 || Mount Lemmon || Mount Lemmon Survey || — || align=right data-sort-value="0.75" | 750 m || 
|-id=631 bgcolor=#E9E9E9
| 459631 ||  || — || January 1, 2012 || Mount Lemmon || Mount Lemmon Survey || — || align=right | 2.6 km || 
|-id=632 bgcolor=#fefefe
| 459632 ||  || — || May 6, 2006 || Mount Lemmon || Mount Lemmon Survey || — || align=right data-sort-value="0.86" | 860 m || 
|-id=633 bgcolor=#E9E9E9
| 459633 ||  || — || October 3, 2006 || Mount Lemmon || Mount Lemmon Survey || — || align=right data-sort-value="0.93" | 930 m || 
|-id=634 bgcolor=#fefefe
| 459634 ||  || — || January 18, 2009 || Mount Lemmon || Mount Lemmon Survey || — || align=right data-sort-value="0.52" | 520 m || 
|-id=635 bgcolor=#fefefe
| 459635 ||  || — || March 18, 2013 || Kitt Peak || Spacewatch || — || align=right data-sort-value="0.69" | 690 m || 
|-id=636 bgcolor=#d6d6d6
| 459636 ||  || — || April 13, 2013 || Kitt Peak || Spacewatch || — || align=right | 3.8 km || 
|-id=637 bgcolor=#fefefe
| 459637 ||  || — || January 29, 2009 || Kitt Peak || Spacewatch || ERI || align=right | 1.2 km || 
|-id=638 bgcolor=#E9E9E9
| 459638 ||  || — || October 18, 2006 || Kitt Peak || Spacewatch || MAR || align=right data-sort-value="0.93" | 930 m || 
|-id=639 bgcolor=#fefefe
| 459639 ||  || — || December 22, 2008 || Kitt Peak || Spacewatch || — || align=right data-sort-value="0.71" | 710 m || 
|-id=640 bgcolor=#fefefe
| 459640 ||  || — || December 30, 2008 || Kitt Peak || Spacewatch || — || align=right data-sort-value="0.79" | 790 m || 
|-id=641 bgcolor=#fefefe
| 459641 ||  || — || February 22, 2009 || Catalina || CSS || — || align=right | 1.3 km || 
|-id=642 bgcolor=#E9E9E9
| 459642 ||  || — || May 15, 2005 || Mount Lemmon || Mount Lemmon Survey || — || align=right | 1.0 km || 
|-id=643 bgcolor=#E9E9E9
| 459643 ||  || — || October 30, 2010 || Mount Lemmon || Mount Lemmon Survey || MAR || align=right | 1.0 km || 
|-id=644 bgcolor=#fefefe
| 459644 ||  || — || March 11, 2005 || Mount Lemmon || Mount Lemmon Survey || NYS || align=right data-sort-value="0.71" | 710 m || 
|-id=645 bgcolor=#fefefe
| 459645 ||  || — || September 10, 2010 || Kitt Peak || Spacewatch || — || align=right data-sort-value="0.78" | 780 m || 
|-id=646 bgcolor=#fefefe
| 459646 ||  || — || April 19, 2006 || Mount Lemmon || Mount Lemmon Survey || — || align=right data-sort-value="0.64" | 640 m || 
|-id=647 bgcolor=#E9E9E9
| 459647 ||  || — || September 17, 2006 || Catalina || CSS || — || align=right | 1.2 km || 
|-id=648 bgcolor=#fefefe
| 459648 ||  || — || February 1, 2009 || Mount Lemmon || Mount Lemmon Survey || — || align=right data-sort-value="0.67" | 670 m || 
|-id=649 bgcolor=#E9E9E9
| 459649 ||  || — || December 28, 2011 || Kitt Peak || Spacewatch || — || align=right | 1.9 km || 
|-id=650 bgcolor=#E9E9E9
| 459650 ||  || — || June 2, 2005 || Siding Spring || SSS || — || align=right | 1.1 km || 
|-id=651 bgcolor=#E9E9E9
| 459651 ||  || — || April 21, 2004 || Kitt Peak || Spacewatch || — || align=right | 2.3 km || 
|-id=652 bgcolor=#E9E9E9
| 459652 ||  || — || April 22, 2013 || Mount Lemmon || Mount Lemmon Survey || — || align=right data-sort-value="0.97" | 970 m || 
|-id=653 bgcolor=#fefefe
| 459653 ||  || — || April 10, 2005 || Mount Lemmon || Mount Lemmon Survey || — || align=right data-sort-value="0.78" | 780 m || 
|-id=654 bgcolor=#d6d6d6
| 459654 ||  || — || October 20, 2004 || Catalina || CSS || EOS || align=right | 2.3 km || 
|-id=655 bgcolor=#fefefe
| 459655 ||  || — || November 1, 2007 || Mount Lemmon || Mount Lemmon Survey || — || align=right data-sort-value="0.79" | 790 m || 
|-id=656 bgcolor=#fefefe
| 459656 ||  || — || February 27, 2006 || Kitt Peak || Spacewatch || — || align=right data-sort-value="0.68" | 680 m || 
|-id=657 bgcolor=#fefefe
| 459657 ||  || — || November 20, 2007 || Mount Lemmon || Mount Lemmon Survey || — || align=right data-sort-value="0.93" | 930 m || 
|-id=658 bgcolor=#fefefe
| 459658 ||  || — || September 17, 1995 || Kitt Peak || Spacewatch || NYS || align=right data-sort-value="0.61" | 610 m || 
|-id=659 bgcolor=#d6d6d6
| 459659 ||  || — || April 18, 2013 || Kitt Peak || Spacewatch || — || align=right | 3.4 km || 
|-id=660 bgcolor=#fefefe
| 459660 ||  || — || May 4, 2002 || Socorro || LINEAR || — || align=right | 1.3 km || 
|-id=661 bgcolor=#E9E9E9
| 459661 ||  || — || December 15, 2006 || Kitt Peak || Spacewatch || — || align=right | 2.3 km || 
|-id=662 bgcolor=#fefefe
| 459662 ||  || — || March 1, 2009 || Catalina || CSS || ERI || align=right | 1.4 km || 
|-id=663 bgcolor=#E9E9E9
| 459663 ||  || — || April 29, 2009 || Mount Lemmon || Mount Lemmon Survey || — || align=right | 1.2 km || 
|-id=664 bgcolor=#fefefe
| 459664 ||  || — || March 19, 2009 || Kitt Peak || Spacewatch || MAS || align=right data-sort-value="0.64" | 640 m || 
|-id=665 bgcolor=#fefefe
| 459665 ||  || — || May 25, 2006 || Mount Lemmon || Mount Lemmon Survey || — || align=right data-sort-value="0.85" | 850 m || 
|-id=666 bgcolor=#fefefe
| 459666 ||  || — || April 22, 2013 || Mount Lemmon || Mount Lemmon Survey || — || align=right data-sort-value="0.67" | 670 m || 
|-id=667 bgcolor=#fefefe
| 459667 ||  || — || May 18, 2010 || WISE || WISE || — || align=right | 1.4 km || 
|-id=668 bgcolor=#E9E9E9
| 459668 ||  || — || February 11, 2004 || Kitt Peak || Spacewatch || KON || align=right | 2.2 km || 
|-id=669 bgcolor=#fefefe
| 459669 ||  || — || July 5, 2010 || WISE || WISE || — || align=right | 2.5 km || 
|-id=670 bgcolor=#fefefe
| 459670 ||  || — || May 25, 2006 || Mount Lemmon || Mount Lemmon Survey || MAS || align=right data-sort-value="0.62" | 620 m || 
|-id=671 bgcolor=#fefefe
| 459671 ||  || — || December 31, 2011 || Kitt Peak || Spacewatch || — || align=right data-sort-value="0.91" | 910 m || 
|-id=672 bgcolor=#E9E9E9
| 459672 ||  || — || January 15, 2004 || Kitt Peak || Spacewatch || — || align=right | 1.2 km || 
|-id=673 bgcolor=#fefefe
| 459673 ||  || — || March 10, 2005 || Kitt Peak || Spacewatch || — || align=right data-sort-value="0.76" | 760 m || 
|-id=674 bgcolor=#d6d6d6
| 459674 ||  || — || May 16, 2013 || Mount Lemmon || Mount Lemmon Survey || — || align=right | 2.3 km || 
|-id=675 bgcolor=#E9E9E9
| 459675 ||  || — || December 29, 2011 || Mount Lemmon || Mount Lemmon Survey || EUN || align=right | 1.2 km || 
|-id=676 bgcolor=#fefefe
| 459676 ||  || — || February 19, 2009 || Kitt Peak || Spacewatch || MAS || align=right data-sort-value="0.57" | 570 m || 
|-id=677 bgcolor=#E9E9E9
| 459677 ||  || — || September 24, 2009 || Mount Lemmon || Mount Lemmon Survey || EUN || align=right data-sort-value="0.93" | 930 m || 
|-id=678 bgcolor=#d6d6d6
| 459678 ||  || — || May 19, 2013 || Siding Spring || SSS || — || align=right | 4.1 km || 
|-id=679 bgcolor=#fefefe
| 459679 ||  || — || March 23, 2006 || Catalina || CSS || — || align=right data-sort-value="0.72" | 720 m || 
|-id=680 bgcolor=#fefefe
| 459680 ||  || — || May 3, 2005 || Kitt Peak || Spacewatch || — || align=right data-sort-value="0.85" | 850 m || 
|-id=681 bgcolor=#fefefe
| 459681 ||  || — || February 28, 2009 || Kitt Peak || Spacewatch || NYS || align=right data-sort-value="0.65" | 650 m || 
|-id=682 bgcolor=#d6d6d6
| 459682 ||  || — || May 2, 2013 || Kitt Peak || Spacewatch || EOS || align=right | 1.9 km || 
|-id=683 bgcolor=#FFC2E0
| 459683 ||  || — || June 18, 2013 || Mount Lemmon || Mount Lemmon Survey || APOPHAcritical || align=right data-sort-value="0.27" | 270 m || 
|-id=684 bgcolor=#E9E9E9
| 459684 ||  || — || December 1, 2010 || Mount Lemmon || Mount Lemmon Survey || — || align=right | 1.3 km || 
|-id=685 bgcolor=#E9E9E9
| 459685 ||  || — || November 3, 2010 || Mount Lemmon || Mount Lemmon Survey || — || align=right | 2.5 km || 
|-id=686 bgcolor=#E9E9E9
| 459686 ||  || — || December 12, 2006 || Mount Lemmon || Mount Lemmon Survey || — || align=right | 1.8 km || 
|-id=687 bgcolor=#d6d6d6
| 459687 ||  || — || February 11, 2010 || WISE || WISE || — || align=right | 3.8 km || 
|-id=688 bgcolor=#E9E9E9
| 459688 ||  || — || February 21, 2007 || Mount Lemmon || Mount Lemmon Survey || DOR || align=right | 2.4 km || 
|-id=689 bgcolor=#E9E9E9
| 459689 ||  || — || August 28, 2009 || Catalina || CSS || — || align=right | 1.9 km || 
|-id=690 bgcolor=#d6d6d6
| 459690 ||  || — || November 20, 2009 || Mount Lemmon || Mount Lemmon Survey || — || align=right | 2.8 km || 
|-id=691 bgcolor=#E9E9E9
| 459691 ||  || — || July 28, 2009 || Catalina || CSS || EUN || align=right | 1.2 km || 
|-id=692 bgcolor=#E9E9E9
| 459692 ||  || — || June 22, 1996 || Kitt Peak || Spacewatch || (194) || align=right | 1.8 km || 
|-id=693 bgcolor=#E9E9E9
| 459693 ||  || — || January 16, 2011 || Mount Lemmon || Mount Lemmon Survey || — || align=right | 1.6 km || 
|-id=694 bgcolor=#d6d6d6
| 459694 ||  || — || March 3, 2005 || Kitt Peak || Spacewatch || — || align=right | 3.2 km || 
|-id=695 bgcolor=#E9E9E9
| 459695 ||  || — || June 27, 2001 || Kitt Peak || Spacewatch || — || align=right | 1.1 km || 
|-id=696 bgcolor=#E9E9E9
| 459696 ||  || — || January 9, 1999 || Kitt Peak || Spacewatch || — || align=right | 1.6 km || 
|-id=697 bgcolor=#d6d6d6
| 459697 ||  || — || March 17, 2010 || WISE || WISE || — || align=right | 3.8 km || 
|-id=698 bgcolor=#d6d6d6
| 459698 ||  || — || November 19, 2008 || Kitt Peak || Spacewatch || 7:4 || align=right | 2.9 km || 
|-id=699 bgcolor=#E9E9E9
| 459699 ||  || — || March 15, 2012 || Mount Lemmon || Mount Lemmon Survey || — || align=right | 1.8 km || 
|-id=700 bgcolor=#d6d6d6
| 459700 ||  || — || July 29, 2013 || Kitt Peak || Spacewatch || — || align=right | 3.7 km || 
|}

459701–459800 

|-bgcolor=#d6d6d6
| 459701 ||  || — || May 14, 2012 || Mount Lemmon || Mount Lemmon Survey || — || align=right | 3.4 km || 
|-id=702 bgcolor=#E9E9E9
| 459702 ||  || — || December 15, 2006 || Kitt Peak || Spacewatch || EUN || align=right | 1.4 km || 
|-id=703 bgcolor=#d6d6d6
| 459703 ||  || — || February 25, 2006 || Kitt Peak || Spacewatch || — || align=right | 3.0 km || 
|-id=704 bgcolor=#d6d6d6
| 459704 ||  || — || October 10, 2008 || Mount Lemmon || Mount Lemmon Survey || EOS || align=right | 1.6 km || 
|-id=705 bgcolor=#E9E9E9
| 459705 ||  || — || March 12, 2007 || Mount Lemmon || Mount Lemmon Survey || — || align=right | 2.0 km || 
|-id=706 bgcolor=#E9E9E9
| 459706 ||  || — || June 7, 2013 || Mount Lemmon || Mount Lemmon Survey || EUN || align=right | 1.4 km || 
|-id=707 bgcolor=#d6d6d6
| 459707 ||  || — || September 3, 2008 || Kitt Peak || Spacewatch || — || align=right | 2.3 km || 
|-id=708 bgcolor=#d6d6d6
| 459708 ||  || — || September 9, 2008 || Mount Lemmon || Mount Lemmon Survey || — || align=right | 2.5 km || 
|-id=709 bgcolor=#d6d6d6
| 459709 ||  || — || September 30, 1997 || Kitt Peak || Spacewatch || EOS || align=right | 1.5 km || 
|-id=710 bgcolor=#d6d6d6
| 459710 ||  || — || February 8, 2011 || Mount Lemmon || Mount Lemmon Survey || — || align=right | 2.3 km || 
|-id=711 bgcolor=#E9E9E9
| 459711 ||  || — || April 20, 2012 || Catalina || CSS || — || align=right | 2.8 km || 
|-id=712 bgcolor=#E9E9E9
| 459712 ||  || — || September 18, 2009 || Mount Lemmon || Mount Lemmon Survey || — || align=right | 1.3 km || 
|-id=713 bgcolor=#d6d6d6
| 459713 ||  || — || September 29, 2008 || Mount Lemmon || Mount Lemmon Survey || — || align=right | 3.2 km || 
|-id=714 bgcolor=#d6d6d6
| 459714 ||  || — || October 7, 2008 || Kitt Peak || Spacewatch || — || align=right | 2.3 km || 
|-id=715 bgcolor=#d6d6d6
| 459715 ||  || — || February 14, 2010 || Catalina || CSS || — || align=right | 4.5 km || 
|-id=716 bgcolor=#d6d6d6
| 459716 ||  || — || February 8, 2011 || Catalina || CSS || TIR || align=right | 3.0 km || 
|-id=717 bgcolor=#d6d6d6
| 459717 ||  || — || February 27, 2006 || Kitt Peak || Spacewatch || — || align=right | 2.0 km || 
|-id=718 bgcolor=#d6d6d6
| 459718 ||  || — || February 5, 2011 || Mount Lemmon || Mount Lemmon Survey || — || align=right | 2.2 km || 
|-id=719 bgcolor=#d6d6d6
| 459719 ||  || — || November 9, 2009 || Kitt Peak || Spacewatch || — || align=right | 1.9 km || 
|-id=720 bgcolor=#fefefe
| 459720 ||  || — || March 4, 2008 || Kitt Peak || Spacewatch || — || align=right | 1.1 km || 
|-id=721 bgcolor=#E9E9E9
| 459721 ||  || — || February 23, 2012 || Kitt Peak || Spacewatch || — || align=right | 2.3 km || 
|-id=722 bgcolor=#E9E9E9
| 459722 ||  || — || June 17, 2013 || Mount Lemmon || Mount Lemmon Survey || — || align=right | 2.7 km || 
|-id=723 bgcolor=#d6d6d6
| 459723 ||  || — || February 18, 2010 || WISE || WISE || — || align=right | 2.9 km || 
|-id=724 bgcolor=#d6d6d6
| 459724 ||  || — || January 8, 1999 || Kitt Peak || Spacewatch || — || align=right | 2.8 km || 
|-id=725 bgcolor=#E9E9E9
| 459725 ||  || — || March 24, 2003 || Kitt Peak || Spacewatch || — || align=right | 2.5 km || 
|-id=726 bgcolor=#d6d6d6
| 459726 ||  || — || September 17, 2009 || Kitt Peak || Spacewatch || — || align=right | 2.3 km || 
|-id=727 bgcolor=#d6d6d6
| 459727 ||  || — || July 13, 2013 || Mount Lemmon || Mount Lemmon Survey || — || align=right | 1.9 km || 
|-id=728 bgcolor=#d6d6d6
| 459728 ||  || — || January 13, 2011 || Catalina || CSS || — || align=right | 2.5 km || 
|-id=729 bgcolor=#E9E9E9
| 459729 ||  || — || April 20, 2012 || Mount Lemmon || Mount Lemmon Survey || MRX || align=right | 1.0 km || 
|-id=730 bgcolor=#d6d6d6
| 459730 ||  || — || January 8, 2010 || Kitt Peak || Spacewatch || — || align=right | 3.3 km || 
|-id=731 bgcolor=#E9E9E9
| 459731 ||  || — || June 9, 2013 || Mount Lemmon || Mount Lemmon Survey || — || align=right | 2.8 km || 
|-id=732 bgcolor=#d6d6d6
| 459732 ||  || — || July 26, 2008 || Siding Spring || SSS || — || align=right | 2.7 km || 
|-id=733 bgcolor=#d6d6d6
| 459733 ||  || — || November 21, 2009 || Mount Lemmon || Mount Lemmon Survey || — || align=right | 3.4 km || 
|-id=734 bgcolor=#E9E9E9
| 459734 ||  || — || April 15, 2004 || Siding Spring || SSS || EUN || align=right | 1.3 km || 
|-id=735 bgcolor=#fefefe
| 459735 ||  || — || August 29, 2006 || Catalina || CSS || (2076) || align=right data-sort-value="0.84" | 840 m || 
|-id=736 bgcolor=#d6d6d6
| 459736 ||  || — || May 6, 2010 || WISE || WISE || ULA7:4 || align=right | 5.0 km || 
|-id=737 bgcolor=#d6d6d6
| 459737 ||  || — || September 28, 2008 || Mount Lemmon || Mount Lemmon Survey || — || align=right | 2.8 km || 
|-id=738 bgcolor=#E9E9E9
| 459738 ||  || — || March 5, 2008 || Mount Lemmon || Mount Lemmon Survey || EUN || align=right | 1.0 km || 
|-id=739 bgcolor=#d6d6d6
| 459739 ||  || — || May 21, 2006 || Kitt Peak || Spacewatch || — || align=right | 2.5 km || 
|-id=740 bgcolor=#d6d6d6
| 459740 ||  || — || March 2, 2011 || Mount Lemmon || Mount Lemmon Survey || — || align=right | 2.5 km || 
|-id=741 bgcolor=#d6d6d6
| 459741 ||  || — || October 9, 2008 || Kitt Peak || Spacewatch || — || align=right | 2.1 km || 
|-id=742 bgcolor=#E9E9E9
| 459742 ||  || — || February 21, 2007 || Kitt Peak || Spacewatch || — || align=right | 2.7 km || 
|-id=743 bgcolor=#d6d6d6
| 459743 ||  || — || March 10, 2005 || Mount Lemmon || Mount Lemmon Survey || — || align=right | 3.0 km || 
|-id=744 bgcolor=#d6d6d6
| 459744 ||  || — || April 20, 2012 || Kitt Peak || Spacewatch || KOR || align=right | 1.3 km || 
|-id=745 bgcolor=#d6d6d6
| 459745 ||  || — || February 20, 2010 || WISE || WISE || — || align=right | 3.1 km || 
|-id=746 bgcolor=#d6d6d6
| 459746 ||  || — || September 24, 2008 || Kitt Peak || Spacewatch || — || align=right | 2.8 km || 
|-id=747 bgcolor=#d6d6d6
| 459747 ||  || — || August 9, 2013 || Kitt Peak || Spacewatch || — || align=right | 2.4 km || 
|-id=748 bgcolor=#d6d6d6
| 459748 ||  || — || December 20, 2009 || Mount Lemmon || Mount Lemmon Survey || — || align=right | 3.9 km || 
|-id=749 bgcolor=#d6d6d6
| 459749 ||  || — || August 4, 2008 || Siding Spring || SSS || — || align=right | 3.1 km || 
|-id=750 bgcolor=#d6d6d6
| 459750 ||  || — || January 30, 2011 || Mount Lemmon || Mount Lemmon Survey || — || align=right | 4.0 km || 
|-id=751 bgcolor=#E9E9E9
| 459751 ||  || — || February 17, 2007 || Kitt Peak || Spacewatch || — || align=right | 1.4 km || 
|-id=752 bgcolor=#d6d6d6
| 459752 ||  || — || September 24, 2008 || Mount Lemmon || Mount Lemmon Survey || VER || align=right | 2.5 km || 
|-id=753 bgcolor=#d6d6d6
| 459753 ||  || — || April 14, 2007 || Kitt Peak || Spacewatch || — || align=right | 2.2 km || 
|-id=754 bgcolor=#E9E9E9
| 459754 ||  || — || September 27, 2009 || Kitt Peak || Spacewatch || — || align=right | 1.3 km || 
|-id=755 bgcolor=#E9E9E9
| 459755 ||  || — || May 14, 2008 || Mount Lemmon || Mount Lemmon Survey || — || align=right | 2.4 km || 
|-id=756 bgcolor=#E9E9E9
| 459756 ||  || — || September 7, 2004 || Socorro || LINEAR || — || align=right | 2.1 km || 
|-id=757 bgcolor=#E9E9E9
| 459757 ||  || — || October 10, 2004 || Kitt Peak || Spacewatch || HOF || align=right | 1.9 km || 
|-id=758 bgcolor=#E9E9E9
| 459758 ||  || — || September 10, 2004 || Kitt Peak || Spacewatch || — || align=right | 2.4 km || 
|-id=759 bgcolor=#E9E9E9
| 459759 ||  || — || September 10, 2004 || Kitt Peak || Spacewatch || — || align=right | 2.0 km || 
|-id=760 bgcolor=#d6d6d6
| 459760 ||  || — || May 14, 2012 || Mount Lemmon || Mount Lemmon Survey || — || align=right | 3.5 km || 
|-id=761 bgcolor=#d6d6d6
| 459761 ||  || — || March 10, 2005 || Mount Lemmon || Mount Lemmon Survey || — || align=right | 2.7 km || 
|-id=762 bgcolor=#E9E9E9
| 459762 ||  || — || December 28, 2005 || Mount Lemmon || Mount Lemmon Survey || AGN || align=right | 1.4 km || 
|-id=763 bgcolor=#E9E9E9
| 459763 ||  || — || September 29, 2005 || Mount Lemmon || Mount Lemmon Survey || — || align=right data-sort-value="0.82" | 820 m || 
|-id=764 bgcolor=#d6d6d6
| 459764 ||  || — || January 11, 2010 || Kitt Peak || Spacewatch || VER || align=right | 2.7 km || 
|-id=765 bgcolor=#d6d6d6
| 459765 ||  || — || October 2, 2003 || Kitt Peak || Spacewatch || — || align=right | 2.4 km || 
|-id=766 bgcolor=#E9E9E9
| 459766 ||  || — || September 18, 2009 || Kitt Peak || Spacewatch || — || align=right | 1.5 km || 
|-id=767 bgcolor=#E9E9E9
| 459767 ||  || — || June 2, 2008 || Kitt Peak || Spacewatch || — || align=right | 1.8 km || 
|-id=768 bgcolor=#E9E9E9
| 459768 ||  || — || March 1, 2008 || Kitt Peak || Spacewatch || JUN || align=right | 1.2 km || 
|-id=769 bgcolor=#d6d6d6
| 459769 ||  || — || January 15, 2010 || Kitt Peak || Spacewatch || — || align=right | 4.1 km || 
|-id=770 bgcolor=#d6d6d6
| 459770 ||  || — || October 9, 2008 || Mount Lemmon || Mount Lemmon Survey || — || align=right | 3.2 km || 
|-id=771 bgcolor=#d6d6d6
| 459771 ||  || — || October 10, 2008 || Mount Lemmon || Mount Lemmon Survey || EOS || align=right | 1.6 km || 
|-id=772 bgcolor=#E9E9E9
| 459772 ||  || — || September 7, 2000 || Kitt Peak || Spacewatch || JUN || align=right | 1.3 km || 
|-id=773 bgcolor=#fefefe
| 459773 ||  || — || February 1, 2012 || Kitt Peak || Spacewatch || — || align=right data-sort-value="0.77" | 770 m || 
|-id=774 bgcolor=#d6d6d6
| 459774 ||  || — || May 9, 2000 || Kitt Peak || Spacewatch || — || align=right | 3.5 km || 
|-id=775 bgcolor=#E9E9E9
| 459775 ||  || — || December 21, 2006 || Kitt Peak || Spacewatch || — || align=right | 1.7 km || 
|-id=776 bgcolor=#E9E9E9
| 459776 ||  || — || September 20, 2009 || Mount Lemmon || Mount Lemmon Survey || — || align=right data-sort-value="0.97" | 970 m || 
|-id=777 bgcolor=#d6d6d6
| 459777 ||  || — || March 14, 2011 || Mount Lemmon || Mount Lemmon Survey || — || align=right | 3.1 km || 
|-id=778 bgcolor=#d6d6d6
| 459778 ||  || — || September 18, 2003 || Kitt Peak || Spacewatch || — || align=right | 2.2 km || 
|-id=779 bgcolor=#d6d6d6
| 459779 ||  || — || February 26, 2011 || Kitt Peak || Spacewatch || — || align=right | 3.0 km || 
|-id=780 bgcolor=#d6d6d6
| 459780 ||  || — || September 2, 2008 || Kitt Peak || Spacewatch || — || align=right | 2.4 km || 
|-id=781 bgcolor=#d6d6d6
| 459781 ||  || — || March 6, 1994 || Kitt Peak || Spacewatch || — || align=right | 3.7 km || 
|-id=782 bgcolor=#E9E9E9
| 459782 ||  || — || May 6, 2008 || Mount Lemmon || Mount Lemmon Survey || — || align=right | 1.4 km || 
|-id=783 bgcolor=#E9E9E9
| 459783 ||  || — || August 22, 2004 || Kitt Peak || Spacewatch || — || align=right | 1.7 km || 
|-id=784 bgcolor=#d6d6d6
| 459784 ||  || — || March 24, 2006 || Kitt Peak || Spacewatch || — || align=right | 2.9 km || 
|-id=785 bgcolor=#E9E9E9
| 459785 ||  || — || September 22, 2009 || Kitt Peak || Spacewatch || — || align=right | 2.2 km || 
|-id=786 bgcolor=#d6d6d6
| 459786 ||  || — || April 2, 2006 || Kitt Peak || Spacewatch || — || align=right | 2.7 km || 
|-id=787 bgcolor=#d6d6d6
| 459787 ||  || — || March 11, 2005 || Mount Lemmon || Mount Lemmon Survey || — || align=right | 3.1 km || 
|-id=788 bgcolor=#d6d6d6
| 459788 ||  || — || October 9, 2007 || Mount Lemmon || Mount Lemmon Survey || — || align=right | 3.8 km || 
|-id=789 bgcolor=#E9E9E9
| 459789 ||  || — || May 6, 2008 || Siding Spring || SSS || — || align=right | 2.6 km || 
|-id=790 bgcolor=#d6d6d6
| 459790 ||  || — || September 13, 2007 || Mount Lemmon || Mount Lemmon Survey || Tj (2.99) || align=right | 3.6 km || 
|-id=791 bgcolor=#d6d6d6
| 459791 ||  || — || September 24, 2008 || Catalina || CSS || — || align=right | 3.6 km || 
|-id=792 bgcolor=#d6d6d6
| 459792 ||  || — || September 5, 2008 || Kitt Peak || Spacewatch || — || align=right | 2.8 km || 
|-id=793 bgcolor=#d6d6d6
| 459793 ||  || — || October 9, 2008 || Mount Lemmon || Mount Lemmon Survey || — || align=right | 2.5 km || 
|-id=794 bgcolor=#d6d6d6
| 459794 ||  || — || January 15, 2005 || Kitt Peak || Spacewatch || — || align=right | 2.8 km || 
|-id=795 bgcolor=#d6d6d6
| 459795 ||  || — || July 29, 2008 || Kitt Peak || Spacewatch || KOR || align=right | 1.5 km || 
|-id=796 bgcolor=#d6d6d6
| 459796 ||  || — || April 2, 2005 || Mount Lemmon || Mount Lemmon Survey || — || align=right | 3.2 km || 
|-id=797 bgcolor=#d6d6d6
| 459797 ||  || — || February 1, 2005 || Kitt Peak || Spacewatch || — || align=right | 2.9 km || 
|-id=798 bgcolor=#d6d6d6
| 459798 ||  || — || March 11, 2005 || Mount Lemmon || Mount Lemmon Survey || — || align=right | 3.1 km || 
|-id=799 bgcolor=#d6d6d6
| 459799 ||  || — || September 3, 2007 || Mount Lemmon || Mount Lemmon Survey || TIR || align=right | 3.5 km || 
|-id=800 bgcolor=#d6d6d6
| 459800 ||  || — || March 9, 2005 || Mount Lemmon || Mount Lemmon Survey || — || align=right | 2.8 km || 
|}

459801–459900 

|-bgcolor=#d6d6d6
| 459801 ||  || — || September 2, 2013 || Mount Lemmon || Mount Lemmon Survey || EOS || align=right | 2.1 km || 
|-id=802 bgcolor=#d6d6d6
| 459802 ||  || — || February 8, 2011 || Mount Lemmon || Mount Lemmon Survey || EOS || align=right | 2.0 km || 
|-id=803 bgcolor=#E9E9E9
| 459803 ||  || — || November 20, 2009 || Mount Lemmon || Mount Lemmon Survey || — || align=right | 2.3 km || 
|-id=804 bgcolor=#d6d6d6
| 459804 ||  || — || September 12, 2007 || Mount Lemmon || Mount Lemmon Survey || — || align=right | 3.0 km || 
|-id=805 bgcolor=#d6d6d6
| 459805 ||  || — || September 13, 2007 || Mount Lemmon || Mount Lemmon Survey || — || align=right | 2.8 km || 
|-id=806 bgcolor=#d6d6d6
| 459806 ||  || — || March 11, 2005 || Catalina || CSS || — || align=right | 4.1 km || 
|-id=807 bgcolor=#E9E9E9
| 459807 ||  || — || November 17, 2009 || Kitt Peak || Spacewatch || — || align=right | 2.5 km || 
|-id=808 bgcolor=#d6d6d6
| 459808 ||  || — || September 12, 2007 || Catalina || CSS || — || align=right | 4.1 km || 
|-id=809 bgcolor=#d6d6d6
| 459809 ||  || — || January 13, 2005 || Kitt Peak || Spacewatch || — || align=right | 3.2 km || 
|-id=810 bgcolor=#d6d6d6
| 459810 ||  || — || January 8, 2010 || Kitt Peak || Spacewatch || VER || align=right | 2.9 km || 
|-id=811 bgcolor=#d6d6d6
| 459811 ||  || — || April 29, 2006 || Kitt Peak || Spacewatch || — || align=right | 3.2 km || 
|-id=812 bgcolor=#E9E9E9
| 459812 ||  || — || January 23, 2006 || Kitt Peak || Spacewatch || — || align=right | 2.2 km || 
|-id=813 bgcolor=#fefefe
| 459813 ||  || — || March 8, 2005 || Mount Lemmon || Mount Lemmon Survey || — || align=right | 1.2 km || 
|-id=814 bgcolor=#d6d6d6
| 459814 ||  || — || March 5, 2011 || Mount Lemmon || Mount Lemmon Survey || KOR || align=right | 1.4 km || 
|-id=815 bgcolor=#d6d6d6
| 459815 ||  || — || October 8, 2008 || Kitt Peak || Spacewatch || EOS || align=right | 1.6 km || 
|-id=816 bgcolor=#E9E9E9
| 459816 ||  || — || October 4, 1999 || Kitt Peak || Spacewatch || — || align=right | 2.6 km || 
|-id=817 bgcolor=#d6d6d6
| 459817 ||  || — || September 24, 2008 || Kitt Peak || Spacewatch || — || align=right | 2.5 km || 
|-id=818 bgcolor=#d6d6d6
| 459818 ||  || — || September 11, 2007 || Mount Lemmon || Mount Lemmon Survey || — || align=right | 3.2 km || 
|-id=819 bgcolor=#E9E9E9
| 459819 ||  || — || January 27, 2007 || Mount Lemmon || Mount Lemmon Survey || — || align=right | 1.5 km || 
|-id=820 bgcolor=#d6d6d6
| 459820 ||  || — || July 16, 2007 || Socorro || LINEAR || — || align=right | 3.5 km || 
|-id=821 bgcolor=#d6d6d6
| 459821 ||  || — || November 25, 2009 || Kitt Peak || Spacewatch || KOR || align=right | 1.6 km || 
|-id=822 bgcolor=#d6d6d6
| 459822 ||  || — || June 19, 2013 || Kitt Peak || Spacewatch || — || align=right | 3.2 km || 
|-id=823 bgcolor=#d6d6d6
| 459823 ||  || — || June 16, 2012 || Mount Lemmon || Mount Lemmon Survey || — || align=right | 4.4 km || 
|-id=824 bgcolor=#d6d6d6
| 459824 ||  || — || September 29, 2008 || Mount Lemmon || Mount Lemmon Survey || — || align=right | 2.8 km || 
|-id=825 bgcolor=#E9E9E9
| 459825 ||  || — || September 15, 2004 || Kitt Peak || Spacewatch || NEM || align=right | 2.2 km || 
|-id=826 bgcolor=#d6d6d6
| 459826 ||  || — || November 20, 2008 || Kitt Peak || Spacewatch || — || align=right | 3.1 km || 
|-id=827 bgcolor=#d6d6d6
| 459827 ||  || — || September 24, 2008 || Kitt Peak || Spacewatch || — || align=right | 3.5 km || 
|-id=828 bgcolor=#E9E9E9
| 459828 ||  || — || April 22, 2007 || Kitt Peak || Spacewatch || — || align=right | 2.6 km || 
|-id=829 bgcolor=#d6d6d6
| 459829 ||  || — || February 17, 2010 || Catalina || CSS || — || align=right | 4.4 km || 
|-id=830 bgcolor=#E9E9E9
| 459830 ||  || — || October 7, 2004 || Kitt Peak || Spacewatch || — || align=right | 2.1 km || 
|-id=831 bgcolor=#d6d6d6
| 459831 ||  || — || September 13, 2013 || Catalina || CSS || — || align=right | 3.4 km || 
|-id=832 bgcolor=#d6d6d6
| 459832 ||  || — || March 6, 2011 || Mount Lemmon || Mount Lemmon Survey || EOS || align=right | 1.8 km || 
|-id=833 bgcolor=#d6d6d6
| 459833 ||  || — || June 17, 2006 || Kitt Peak || Spacewatch || — || align=right | 3.2 km || 
|-id=834 bgcolor=#d6d6d6
| 459834 ||  || — || September 23, 2008 || Mount Lemmon || Mount Lemmon Survey || — || align=right | 3.0 km || 
|-id=835 bgcolor=#d6d6d6
| 459835 ||  || — || June 9, 2012 || Mount Lemmon || Mount Lemmon Survey || — || align=right | 2.8 km || 
|-id=836 bgcolor=#E9E9E9
| 459836 ||  || — || December 10, 2010 || Mount Lemmon || Mount Lemmon Survey || EUN || align=right | 1.5 km || 
|-id=837 bgcolor=#d6d6d6
| 459837 ||  || — || March 18, 2010 || Mount Lemmon || Mount Lemmon Survey || — || align=right | 4.9 km || 
|-id=838 bgcolor=#E9E9E9
| 459838 ||  || — || October 27, 2009 || Mount Lemmon || Mount Lemmon Survey || — || align=right | 1.8 km || 
|-id=839 bgcolor=#d6d6d6
| 459839 ||  || — || January 2, 2009 || Mount Lemmon || Mount Lemmon Survey || 7:4 || align=right | 4.1 km || 
|-id=840 bgcolor=#E9E9E9
| 459840 ||  || — || November 9, 2009 || Mount Lemmon || Mount Lemmon Survey || — || align=right | 2.7 km || 
|-id=841 bgcolor=#E9E9E9
| 459841 ||  || — || March 26, 2007 || Kitt Peak || Spacewatch || — || align=right | 2.2 km || 
|-id=842 bgcolor=#d6d6d6
| 459842 ||  || — || April 9, 2005 || Kitt Peak || Spacewatch || — || align=right | 3.4 km || 
|-id=843 bgcolor=#E9E9E9
| 459843 ||  || — || January 23, 2006 || Mount Lemmon || Mount Lemmon Survey || AGN || align=right | 1.1 km || 
|-id=844 bgcolor=#fefefe
| 459844 ||  || — || February 28, 2009 || Catalina || CSS || H || align=right data-sort-value="0.90" | 900 m || 
|-id=845 bgcolor=#fefefe
| 459845 ||  || — || September 23, 2009 || Kitt Peak || Spacewatch || — || align=right data-sort-value="0.83" | 830 m || 
|-id=846 bgcolor=#E9E9E9
| 459846 ||  || — || March 11, 1999 || Kitt Peak || Spacewatch || — || align=right | 2.1 km || 
|-id=847 bgcolor=#d6d6d6
| 459847 ||  || — || May 4, 2005 || Mount Lemmon || Mount Lemmon Survey || — || align=right | 3.2 km || 
|-id=848 bgcolor=#d6d6d6
| 459848 ||  || — || January 7, 2010 || Kitt Peak || Spacewatch || — || align=right | 3.2 km || 
|-id=849 bgcolor=#C2FFFF
| 459849 ||  || — || September 20, 2001 || Kitt Peak || Spacewatch || L5 || align=right | 7.2 km || 
|-id=850 bgcolor=#d6d6d6
| 459850 ||  || — || September 13, 2013 || Mount Lemmon || Mount Lemmon Survey || — || align=right | 3.1 km || 
|-id=851 bgcolor=#d6d6d6
| 459851 ||  || — || October 26, 2008 || Kitt Peak || Spacewatch || — || align=right | 3.7 km || 
|-id=852 bgcolor=#d6d6d6
| 459852 ||  || — || September 26, 2008 || Kitt Peak || Spacewatch || — || align=right | 3.1 km || 
|-id=853 bgcolor=#d6d6d6
| 459853 ||  || — || April 2, 2006 || Kitt Peak || Spacewatch || — || align=right | 2.7 km || 
|-id=854 bgcolor=#d6d6d6
| 459854 ||  || — || January 31, 2006 || Kitt Peak || Spacewatch || — || align=right | 2.6 km || 
|-id=855 bgcolor=#d6d6d6
| 459855 ||  || — || October 8, 2008 || Mount Lemmon || Mount Lemmon Survey || EOS || align=right | 1.9 km || 
|-id=856 bgcolor=#d6d6d6
| 459856 ||  || — || September 11, 2007 || Kitt Peak || Spacewatch || — || align=right | 3.0 km || 
|-id=857 bgcolor=#d6d6d6
| 459857 ||  || — || March 9, 2005 || Kitt Peak || Spacewatch || — || align=right | 3.5 km || 
|-id=858 bgcolor=#E9E9E9
| 459858 ||  || — || October 5, 2004 || Kitt Peak || Spacewatch || MRX || align=right | 1.0 km || 
|-id=859 bgcolor=#d6d6d6
| 459859 ||  || — || April 30, 2006 || Kitt Peak || Spacewatch || — || align=right | 3.1 km || 
|-id=860 bgcolor=#d6d6d6
| 459860 ||  || — || October 22, 2008 || Kitt Peak || Spacewatch || — || align=right | 3.6 km || 
|-id=861 bgcolor=#d6d6d6
| 459861 ||  || — || November 8, 2008 || Kitt Peak || Spacewatch || — || align=right | 2.5 km || 
|-id=862 bgcolor=#E9E9E9
| 459862 ||  || — || January 25, 2006 || Kitt Peak || Spacewatch || — || align=right | 2.8 km || 
|-id=863 bgcolor=#d6d6d6
| 459863 ||  || — || March 3, 2000 || Socorro || LINEAR || — || align=right | 2.6 km || 
|-id=864 bgcolor=#d6d6d6
| 459864 ||  || — || May 31, 2006 || Kitt Peak || Spacewatch || — || align=right | 2.6 km || 
|-id=865 bgcolor=#C7FF8F
| 459865 ||  || — || October 31, 2008 || Kitt Peak || Spacewatch || centaur || align=right | 52 km || 
|-id=866 bgcolor=#E9E9E9
| 459866 ||  || — || January 7, 2010 || Kitt Peak || Spacewatch || — || align=right | 1.4 km || 
|-id=867 bgcolor=#E9E9E9
| 459867 ||  || — || February 13, 2010 || Catalina || CSS || EUN || align=right | 1.5 km || 
|-id=868 bgcolor=#d6d6d6
| 459868 ||  || — || May 13, 2011 || Mount Lemmon || Mount Lemmon Survey || Tj (2.99) || align=right | 4.0 km || 
|-id=869 bgcolor=#E9E9E9
| 459869 ||  || — || September 18, 2003 || Kitt Peak || Spacewatch || — || align=right | 1.9 km || 
|-id=870 bgcolor=#C7FF8F
| 459870 ||  || — || November 26, 2013 || Haleakala || Pan-STARRS || centaurdamocloid || align=right | 17 km || 
|-id=871 bgcolor=#E9E9E9
| 459871 ||  || — || February 25, 2006 || Kitt Peak || Spacewatch || MAR || align=right | 1.2 km || 
|-id=872 bgcolor=#FFC2E0
| 459872 ||  || — || March 10, 2014 || Catalina || CSS || APOfastcritical || align=right data-sort-value="0.078" | 78 m || 
|-id=873 bgcolor=#fefefe
| 459873 ||  || — || December 9, 2010 || Catalina || CSS || H || align=right data-sort-value="0.88" | 880 m || 
|-id=874 bgcolor=#fefefe
| 459874 ||  || — || September 20, 2011 || Catalina || CSS || NYS || align=right data-sort-value="0.69" | 690 m || 
|-id=875 bgcolor=#fefefe
| 459875 ||  || — || August 26, 2012 || Siding Spring || SSS || H || align=right data-sort-value="0.70" | 700 m || 
|-id=876 bgcolor=#fefefe
| 459876 ||  || — || December 21, 2006 || Mount Lemmon || Mount Lemmon Survey || — || align=right data-sort-value="0.75" | 750 m || 
|-id=877 bgcolor=#fefefe
| 459877 ||  || — || July 29, 2011 || Siding Spring || SSS || — || align=right data-sort-value="0.78" | 780 m || 
|-id=878 bgcolor=#fefefe
| 459878 ||  || — || June 13, 2004 || Kitt Peak || Spacewatch || H || align=right data-sort-value="0.65" | 650 m || 
|-id=879 bgcolor=#fefefe
| 459879 ||  || — || May 27, 2010 || WISE || WISE || — || align=right | 2.4 km || 
|-id=880 bgcolor=#FA8072
| 459880 ||  || — || September 19, 2012 || Mount Lemmon || Mount Lemmon Survey || H || align=right data-sort-value="0.57" | 570 m || 
|-id=881 bgcolor=#fefefe
| 459881 ||  || — || May 2, 2014 || Catalina || CSS || H || align=right data-sort-value="0.81" | 810 m || 
|-id=882 bgcolor=#E9E9E9
| 459882 ||  || — || July 20, 2006 || Siding Spring || SSS || — || align=right | 1.6 km || 
|-id=883 bgcolor=#E9E9E9
| 459883 ||  || — || June 28, 2010 || WISE || WISE || — || align=right | 2.5 km || 
|-id=884 bgcolor=#E9E9E9
| 459884 ||  || — || August 10, 2010 || Kitt Peak || Spacewatch || — || align=right | 2.0 km || 
|-id=885 bgcolor=#FA8072
| 459885 ||  || — || December 8, 2005 || Kitt Peak || Spacewatch || H || align=right data-sort-value="0.67" | 670 m || 
|-id=886 bgcolor=#FA8072
| 459886 ||  || — || January 31, 2008 || Catalina || CSS || H || align=right data-sort-value="0.78" | 780 m || 
|-id=887 bgcolor=#fefefe
| 459887 ||  || — || November 20, 2008 || Mount Lemmon || Mount Lemmon Survey || — || align=right data-sort-value="0.75" | 750 m || 
|-id=888 bgcolor=#fefefe
| 459888 ||  || — || September 26, 2011 || Kitt Peak || Spacewatch || — || align=right data-sort-value="0.71" | 710 m || 
|-id=889 bgcolor=#FA8072
| 459889 ||  || — || October 9, 2007 || Catalina || CSS || H || align=right data-sort-value="0.65" | 650 m || 
|-id=890 bgcolor=#fefefe
| 459890 ||  || — || June 21, 2007 || Mount Lemmon || Mount Lemmon Survey || — || align=right data-sort-value="0.80" | 800 m || 
|-id=891 bgcolor=#fefefe
| 459891 ||  || — || May 2, 2014 || Mount Lemmon || Mount Lemmon Survey || — || align=right data-sort-value="0.76" | 760 m || 
|-id=892 bgcolor=#fefefe
| 459892 ||  || — || October 20, 2011 || Mount Lemmon || Mount Lemmon Survey || NYS || align=right data-sort-value="0.52" | 520 m || 
|-id=893 bgcolor=#E9E9E9
| 459893 ||  || — || May 28, 2009 || Kitt Peak || Spacewatch || — || align=right | 2.8 km || 
|-id=894 bgcolor=#fefefe
| 459894 ||  || — || November 8, 2008 || Kitt Peak || Spacewatch || — || align=right data-sort-value="0.73" | 730 m || 
|-id=895 bgcolor=#E9E9E9
| 459895 ||  || — || March 19, 2009 || Mount Lemmon || Mount Lemmon Survey || (5) || align=right | 1.1 km || 
|-id=896 bgcolor=#fefefe
| 459896 ||  || — || January 25, 2009 || Kitt Peak || Spacewatch || — || align=right data-sort-value="0.86" | 860 m || 
|-id=897 bgcolor=#E9E9E9
| 459897 ||  || — || October 27, 2006 || Catalina || CSS || — || align=right | 3.5 km || 
|-id=898 bgcolor=#FA8072
| 459898 ||  || — || December 8, 2012 || Catalina || CSS || H || align=right data-sort-value="0.69" | 690 m || 
|-id=899 bgcolor=#FA8072
| 459899 ||  || — || December 19, 2007 || Mount Lemmon || Mount Lemmon Survey || — || align=right | 1.7 km || 
|-id=900 bgcolor=#fefefe
| 459900 ||  || — || May 9, 2007 || Kitt Peak || Spacewatch || (2076) || align=right data-sort-value="0.78" | 780 m || 
|}

459901–460000 

|-bgcolor=#fefefe
| 459901 ||  || — || August 26, 2011 || Kitt Peak || Spacewatch || — || align=right data-sort-value="0.73" | 730 m || 
|-id=902 bgcolor=#fefefe
| 459902 ||  || — || November 17, 2001 || Kitt Peak || Spacewatch || V || align=right data-sort-value="0.58" | 580 m || 
|-id=903 bgcolor=#E9E9E9
| 459903 ||  || — || June 21, 2010 || WISE || WISE || — || align=right | 1.8 km || 
|-id=904 bgcolor=#fefefe
| 459904 ||  || — || August 9, 2004 || Socorro || LINEAR || — || align=right data-sort-value="0.68" | 680 m || 
|-id=905 bgcolor=#fefefe
| 459905 ||  || — || October 20, 2007 || Mount Lemmon || Mount Lemmon Survey || — || align=right data-sort-value="0.94" | 940 m || 
|-id=906 bgcolor=#fefefe
| 459906 ||  || — || December 5, 2007 || Kitt Peak || Spacewatch || — || align=right | 1.1 km || 
|-id=907 bgcolor=#fefefe
| 459907 ||  || — || January 5, 2006 || Kitt Peak || Spacewatch || — || align=right data-sort-value="0.74" | 740 m || 
|-id=908 bgcolor=#E9E9E9
| 459908 ||  || — || June 6, 2010 || Kitt Peak || Spacewatch || — || align=right | 2.0 km || 
|-id=909 bgcolor=#fefefe
| 459909 ||  || — || May 14, 2010 || Mount Lemmon || Mount Lemmon Survey || — || align=right data-sort-value="0.78" | 780 m || 
|-id=910 bgcolor=#fefefe
| 459910 ||  || — || June 8, 2000 || Socorro || LINEAR || — || align=right | 2.7 km || 
|-id=911 bgcolor=#fefefe
| 459911 ||  || — || April 20, 2010 || Mount Lemmon || Mount Lemmon Survey || — || align=right data-sort-value="0.94" | 940 m || 
|-id=912 bgcolor=#E9E9E9
| 459912 ||  || — || June 25, 2010 || WISE || WISE || — || align=right | 3.0 km || 
|-id=913 bgcolor=#fefefe
| 459913 ||  || — || November 20, 2007 || Kitt Peak || Spacewatch || — || align=right data-sort-value="0.90" | 900 m || 
|-id=914 bgcolor=#E9E9E9
| 459914 ||  || — || February 12, 2008 || Mount Lemmon || Mount Lemmon Survey || EUN || align=right | 1.1 km || 
|-id=915 bgcolor=#FA8072
| 459915 ||  || — || February 5, 2009 || Kitt Peak || Spacewatch || — || align=right data-sort-value="0.88" | 880 m || 
|-id=916 bgcolor=#fefefe
| 459916 ||  || — || November 14, 2001 || Kitt Peak || Spacewatch || — || align=right data-sort-value="0.59" | 590 m || 
|-id=917 bgcolor=#d6d6d6
| 459917 ||  || — || September 27, 2009 || Catalina || CSS || — || align=right | 1.9 km || 
|-id=918 bgcolor=#fefefe
| 459918 ||  || — || August 21, 2007 || Siding Spring || SSS || — || align=right | 1.0 km || 
|-id=919 bgcolor=#d6d6d6
| 459919 ||  || — || March 2, 2010 || WISE || WISE || — || align=right | 3.9 km || 
|-id=920 bgcolor=#E9E9E9
| 459920 ||  || — || November 18, 2006 || Mount Lemmon || Mount Lemmon Survey || — || align=right | 2.4 km || 
|-id=921 bgcolor=#fefefe
| 459921 ||  || — || January 13, 2008 || Mount Lemmon || Mount Lemmon Survey || H || align=right data-sort-value="0.57" | 570 m || 
|-id=922 bgcolor=#E9E9E9
| 459922 ||  || — || February 28, 2008 || Kitt Peak || Spacewatch || — || align=right | 2.7 km || 
|-id=923 bgcolor=#E9E9E9
| 459923 ||  || — || September 2, 2010 || Mount Lemmon || Mount Lemmon Survey || — || align=right | 2.0 km || 
|-id=924 bgcolor=#fefefe
| 459924 ||  || — || September 9, 2007 || Siding Spring || SSS || — || align=right | 1.1 km || 
|-id=925 bgcolor=#fefefe
| 459925 ||  || — || August 9, 2004 || Socorro || LINEAR || H || align=right data-sort-value="0.75" | 750 m || 
|-id=926 bgcolor=#fefefe
| 459926 ||  || — || October 8, 2007 || Catalina || CSS || — || align=right | 1.00 km || 
|-id=927 bgcolor=#E9E9E9
| 459927 ||  || — || August 13, 2010 || Kitt Peak || Spacewatch || — || align=right | 1.4 km || 
|-id=928 bgcolor=#E9E9E9
| 459928 ||  || — || May 14, 2005 || Mount Lemmon || Mount Lemmon Survey || — || align=right | 1.4 km || 
|-id=929 bgcolor=#E9E9E9
| 459929 ||  || — || November 18, 2006 || Mount Lemmon || Mount Lemmon Survey || JUN || align=right | 1.1 km || 
|-id=930 bgcolor=#d6d6d6
| 459930 ||  || — || December 15, 2010 || Mount Lemmon || Mount Lemmon Survey || — || align=right | 3.6 km || 
|-id=931 bgcolor=#d6d6d6
| 459931 ||  || — || January 22, 2006 || Mount Lemmon || Mount Lemmon Survey || — || align=right | 2.8 km || 
|-id=932 bgcolor=#E9E9E9
| 459932 ||  || — || December 13, 2006 || Kitt Peak || Spacewatch || — || align=right | 2.4 km || 
|-id=933 bgcolor=#fefefe
| 459933 ||  || — || October 10, 2007 || Mount Lemmon || Mount Lemmon Survey || — || align=right data-sort-value="0.75" | 750 m || 
|-id=934 bgcolor=#d6d6d6
| 459934 ||  || — || September 15, 2009 || Kitt Peak || Spacewatch || EOS || align=right | 1.8 km || 
|-id=935 bgcolor=#fefefe
| 459935 ||  || — || September 26, 2008 || Kitt Peak || Spacewatch || — || align=right data-sort-value="0.62" | 620 m || 
|-id=936 bgcolor=#E9E9E9
| 459936 ||  || — || March 9, 2010 || WISE || WISE || — || align=right | 1.7 km || 
|-id=937 bgcolor=#fefefe
| 459937 ||  || — || October 8, 2007 || Anderson Mesa || LONEOS || V || align=right data-sort-value="0.75" | 750 m || 
|-id=938 bgcolor=#d6d6d6
| 459938 ||  || — || July 2, 2014 || Mount Lemmon || Mount Lemmon Survey || — || align=right | 2.9 km || 
|-id=939 bgcolor=#d6d6d6
| 459939 ||  || — || September 27, 2003 || Kitt Peak || Spacewatch || THB || align=right | 2.7 km || 
|-id=940 bgcolor=#E9E9E9
| 459940 ||  || — || December 15, 2007 || Mount Lemmon || Mount Lemmon Survey || — || align=right | 1.2 km || 
|-id=941 bgcolor=#d6d6d6
| 459941 ||  || — || January 23, 2011 || Mount Lemmon || Mount Lemmon Survey || — || align=right | 2.2 km || 
|-id=942 bgcolor=#d6d6d6
| 459942 ||  || — || October 17, 2009 || Catalina || CSS || — || align=right | 3.8 km || 
|-id=943 bgcolor=#fefefe
| 459943 ||  || — || February 19, 2009 || Kitt Peak || Spacewatch || V || align=right data-sort-value="0.53" | 530 m || 
|-id=944 bgcolor=#fefefe
| 459944 ||  || — || September 24, 2011 || Catalina || CSS || — || align=right data-sort-value="0.71" | 710 m || 
|-id=945 bgcolor=#E9E9E9
| 459945 ||  || — || October 20, 2006 || Kitt Peak || Spacewatch || — || align=right | 1.2 km || 
|-id=946 bgcolor=#fefefe
| 459946 ||  || — || October 28, 2011 || Kitt Peak || Spacewatch || — || align=right data-sort-value="0.66" | 660 m || 
|-id=947 bgcolor=#fefefe
| 459947 ||  || — || October 27, 2011 || Mount Lemmon || Mount Lemmon Survey || — || align=right data-sort-value="0.87" | 870 m || 
|-id=948 bgcolor=#d6d6d6
| 459948 ||  || — || March 31, 2013 || Catalina || CSS || — || align=right | 3.0 km || 
|-id=949 bgcolor=#d6d6d6
| 459949 ||  || — || October 22, 2003 || Socorro || LINEAR || — || align=right | 4.4 km || 
|-id=950 bgcolor=#E9E9E9
| 459950 ||  || — || October 28, 2006 || Mount Lemmon || Mount Lemmon Survey || — || align=right data-sort-value="0.86" | 860 m || 
|-id=951 bgcolor=#d6d6d6
| 459951 ||  || — || November 9, 2009 || Catalina || CSS || TIR || align=right | 2.6 km || 
|-id=952 bgcolor=#E9E9E9
| 459952 ||  || — || August 18, 2006 || Kitt Peak || Spacewatch || — || align=right data-sort-value="0.75" | 750 m || 
|-id=953 bgcolor=#fefefe
| 459953 ||  || — || December 27, 2011 || Mount Lemmon || Mount Lemmon Survey || V || align=right data-sort-value="0.58" | 580 m || 
|-id=954 bgcolor=#E9E9E9
| 459954 ||  || — || December 18, 2007 || Kitt Peak || Spacewatch || — || align=right | 2.2 km || 
|-id=955 bgcolor=#E9E9E9
| 459955 ||  || — || December 4, 2007 || Kitt Peak || Spacewatch || — || align=right | 1.2 km || 
|-id=956 bgcolor=#E9E9E9
| 459956 ||  || — || January 20, 2008 || Kitt Peak || Spacewatch || (5) || align=right data-sort-value="0.88" | 880 m || 
|-id=957 bgcolor=#fefefe
| 459957 ||  || — || October 24, 2011 || Kitt Peak || Spacewatch || — || align=right data-sort-value="0.65" | 650 m || 
|-id=958 bgcolor=#fefefe
| 459958 ||  || — || August 8, 2010 || Siding Spring || SSS || — || align=right | 1.1 km || 
|-id=959 bgcolor=#fefefe
| 459959 ||  || — || September 13, 2007 || Catalina || CSS || — || align=right data-sort-value="0.73" | 730 m || 
|-id=960 bgcolor=#fefefe
| 459960 ||  || — || August 8, 2004 || Anderson Mesa || LONEOS || — || align=right data-sort-value="0.74" | 740 m || 
|-id=961 bgcolor=#E9E9E9
| 459961 ||  || — || December 13, 2006 || Mount Lemmon || Mount Lemmon Survey || — || align=right | 1.5 km || 
|-id=962 bgcolor=#E9E9E9
| 459962 ||  || — || August 26, 2001 || Anderson Mesa || LONEOS || — || align=right | 2.2 km || 
|-id=963 bgcolor=#fefefe
| 459963 ||  || — || April 22, 2007 || Kitt Peak || Spacewatch || — || align=right data-sort-value="0.68" | 680 m || 
|-id=964 bgcolor=#fefefe
| 459964 ||  || — || April 7, 2013 || Mount Lemmon || Mount Lemmon Survey || MAS || align=right data-sort-value="0.75" | 750 m || 
|-id=965 bgcolor=#fefefe
| 459965 ||  || — || October 11, 1996 || Kitt Peak || Spacewatch || — || align=right data-sort-value="0.89" | 890 m || 
|-id=966 bgcolor=#fefefe
| 459966 ||  || — || January 6, 2006 || Kitt Peak || Spacewatch || — || align=right data-sort-value="0.85" | 850 m || 
|-id=967 bgcolor=#d6d6d6
| 459967 ||  || — || September 26, 2009 || Catalina || CSS || — || align=right | 2.3 km || 
|-id=968 bgcolor=#d6d6d6
| 459968 ||  || — || April 6, 2008 || Mount Lemmon || Mount Lemmon Survey || EOS || align=right | 1.8 km || 
|-id=969 bgcolor=#fefefe
| 459969 ||  || — || November 14, 2007 || Mount Lemmon || Mount Lemmon Survey || — || align=right | 1.1 km || 
|-id=970 bgcolor=#fefefe
| 459970 ||  || — || September 23, 2000 || Anderson Mesa || LONEOS || — || align=right data-sort-value="0.75" | 750 m || 
|-id=971 bgcolor=#C7FF8F
| 459971 ||  || — || March 18, 2010 || Kitt Peak || Spacewatch || centaur || align=right | 21 km || 
|-id=972 bgcolor=#fefefe
| 459972 ||  || — || December 10, 2005 || Kitt Peak || Spacewatch || — || align=right data-sort-value="0.76" | 760 m || 
|-id=973 bgcolor=#d6d6d6
| 459973 ||  || — || December 25, 2005 || Kitt Peak || Spacewatch || — || align=right | 2.0 km || 
|-id=974 bgcolor=#E9E9E9
| 459974 ||  || — || December 17, 2007 || Mount Lemmon || Mount Lemmon Survey || — || align=right | 1.0 km || 
|-id=975 bgcolor=#fefefe
| 459975 ||  || — || December 30, 2008 || Mount Lemmon || Mount Lemmon Survey || — || align=right data-sort-value="0.62" | 620 m || 
|-id=976 bgcolor=#fefefe
| 459976 ||  || — || January 16, 2009 || Mount Lemmon || Mount Lemmon Survey || — || align=right data-sort-value="0.82" | 820 m || 
|-id=977 bgcolor=#fefefe
| 459977 ||  || — || July 18, 2007 || Mount Lemmon || Mount Lemmon Survey || — || align=right data-sort-value="0.73" | 730 m || 
|-id=978 bgcolor=#fefefe
| 459978 ||  || — || September 28, 2003 || Kitt Peak || Spacewatch || MAS || align=right data-sort-value="0.62" | 620 m || 
|-id=979 bgcolor=#fefefe
| 459979 ||  || — || November 3, 2007 || Kitt Peak || Spacewatch || V || align=right data-sort-value="0.55" | 550 m || 
|-id=980 bgcolor=#E9E9E9
| 459980 ||  || — || June 25, 2014 || Mount Lemmon || Mount Lemmon Survey || — || align=right | 1.8 km || 
|-id=981 bgcolor=#fefefe
| 459981 ||  || — || September 18, 1999 || Kitt Peak || Spacewatch || — || align=right data-sort-value="0.68" | 680 m || 
|-id=982 bgcolor=#fefefe
| 459982 ||  || — || September 12, 2007 || Mount Lemmon || Mount Lemmon Survey || — || align=right data-sort-value="0.58" | 580 m || 
|-id=983 bgcolor=#fefefe
| 459983 ||  || — || May 26, 2006 || Kitt Peak || Spacewatch || — || align=right data-sort-value="0.81" | 810 m || 
|-id=984 bgcolor=#fefefe
| 459984 ||  || — || October 14, 2007 || Mount Lemmon || Mount Lemmon Survey || NYS || align=right data-sort-value="0.49" | 490 m || 
|-id=985 bgcolor=#fefefe
| 459985 ||  || — || December 18, 2004 || Mount Lemmon || Mount Lemmon Survey || — || align=right data-sort-value="0.75" | 750 m || 
|-id=986 bgcolor=#fefefe
| 459986 ||  || — || January 15, 1999 || Kitt Peak || Spacewatch || — || align=right data-sort-value="0.62" | 620 m || 
|-id=987 bgcolor=#E9E9E9
| 459987 ||  || — || December 25, 2011 || Mount Lemmon || Mount Lemmon Survey || — || align=right data-sort-value="0.78" | 780 m || 
|-id=988 bgcolor=#fefefe
| 459988 ||  || — || November 3, 2011 || Mount Lemmon || Mount Lemmon Survey || V || align=right data-sort-value="0.61" | 610 m || 
|-id=989 bgcolor=#fefefe
| 459989 ||  || — || September 11, 2007 || Mount Lemmon || Mount Lemmon Survey || — || align=right data-sort-value="0.67" | 670 m || 
|-id=990 bgcolor=#E9E9E9
| 459990 ||  || — || April 27, 2009 || Kitt Peak || Spacewatch || — || align=right | 1.7 km || 
|-id=991 bgcolor=#d6d6d6
| 459991 ||  || — || November 22, 2009 || Kitt Peak || Spacewatch || 7:4 || align=right | 3.1 km || 
|-id=992 bgcolor=#fefefe
| 459992 ||  || — || December 1, 1996 || Kitt Peak || Spacewatch || — || align=right data-sort-value="0.77" | 770 m || 
|-id=993 bgcolor=#E9E9E9
| 459993 ||  || — || May 27, 2014 || Mount Lemmon || Mount Lemmon Survey || — || align=right | 2.3 km || 
|-id=994 bgcolor=#fefefe
| 459994 ||  || — || October 24, 2011 || Kitt Peak || Spacewatch || — || align=right data-sort-value="0.57" | 570 m || 
|-id=995 bgcolor=#E9E9E9
| 459995 ||  || — || January 18, 2012 || Mount Lemmon || Mount Lemmon Survey || — || align=right | 2.1 km || 
|-id=996 bgcolor=#E9E9E9
| 459996 ||  || — || January 12, 2000 || Kitt Peak || Spacewatch || — || align=right data-sort-value="0.89" | 890 m || 
|-id=997 bgcolor=#E9E9E9
| 459997 ||  || — || June 20, 2010 || WISE || WISE || ADE || align=right | 2.0 km || 
|-id=998 bgcolor=#fefefe
| 459998 ||  || — || July 26, 2014 || WISE || WISE || — || align=right | 1.9 km || 
|-id=999 bgcolor=#d6d6d6
| 459999 ||  || — || August 27, 2009 || Catalina || CSS || EOS || align=right | 1.9 km || 
|-id=000 bgcolor=#E9E9E9
| 460000 ||  || — || December 28, 2011 || Mount Lemmon || Mount Lemmon Survey || — || align=right | 1.1 km || 
|}

References

External links 
 Discovery Circumstances: Numbered Minor Planets (455001)–(460000) (IAU Minor Planet Center)

0459